= Hecatomnids =

4th-century BC rulers of Caria and surrounding areas

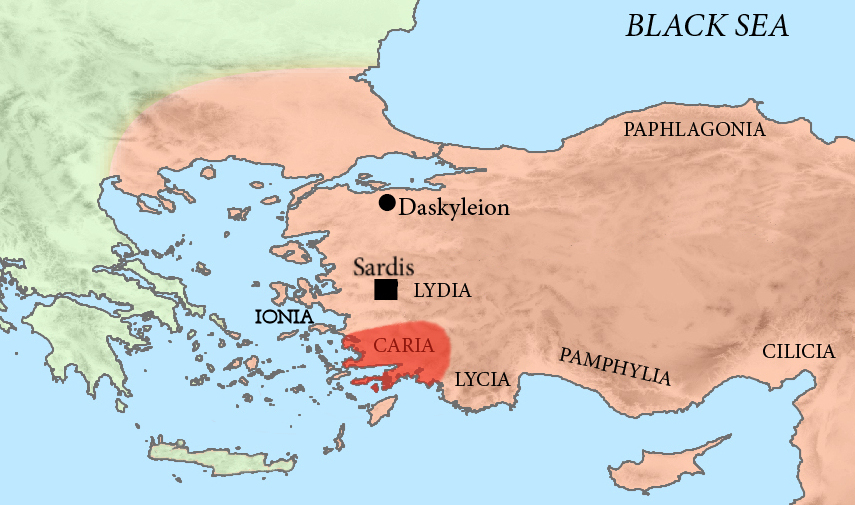
Caria, under the Hecatomnids.

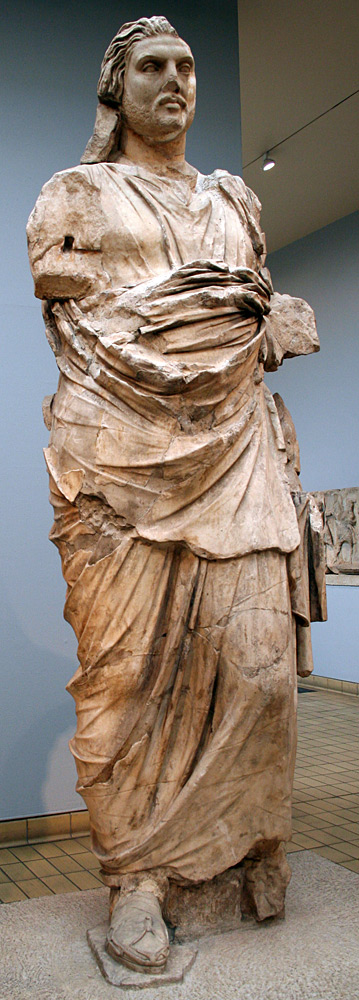
Statue of a Hecatomnid ruler, perhaps Mausolus (British Museum)

The Hecatomnid dynasty or Hecatomnids were the rulers of Caria and surrounding areas c. 395 – c. 330 BCE. They were satraps (governors) under the Achaemenid Empire, although they ruled with considerable autonomy as a hereditary dynasty. The dynasty had previously ruled the city of Mylasa, which became the capital of Hecatomnus, the first indigenous satrap of Caria. The dynastic capital was moved to Halicarnassus by Mausolus and Artemisia, who built the Mausoleum at Halicarnassus, one of the Seven Wonders of the Ancient World, there. The dynasty survived the conquest of the Achaemenid Empire by Alexander the Great when Ada I, the final Hecatomnid ruler of Caria, adopted Alexander the Great as her son. The small family was remarkable for containing so many sets of married siblings.

== Early history ==
The earliest known member of the Hecatomnid family was the dynasty Hyssaldomus. He was the father of Hecatomnus, better known as the founder of the dynasty, and a woman named Aba, who may also have been the mother of Hecatomnus' children. He may have been the first satrap of Caria before his son Hecatomnus, as has been suggested by Louis Robert, although there is no conclusive evidence that this was the case. Several silver coins may have been struck by Hyssaldomus in his capacity as the dynast of Mylasa; these coins have typical Mylasan iconography, but are marked with the Carian letters Ш (w) or 𐋐 (y), which may stand for the unknown equivalent of Hyssaldomus' name in the Carian language.

The Hecatomnids were therefore one of many minor dynasties in Caria. Their seat was originally Mylasa, a major city in central Caria. The family may have gained control of the city when Heracleides of Mylasa fled Caria after the Ionian Revolt. Herodotus records how, during the Ionian Revolt, the dynasts of Cindye included a Mausolus and a Pixodarus. The reuse of those names by later members of the Hecatomnid dynasty suggests that the same family which ruled Mylasa at the start of the fourth century BCE previously ruled Kindye at the start of the fifth, and moved from the smaller town to the larger city at some point before they became satraps of Caria.

The first satrap of the dynasty was Hecatomnus, the son of Hyssaldomus. He was appointed as the first Carian satrap of Caria in the late 390s BCE. Previously, Caria had been governed as part of Lydia, by the satrap Tissaphernes based in Sardis. Tissaphernes was executed by Tithraustes on the orders of Artaxerxes II Memnon in 395 BCE. If Hecatomnus did not become satrap immediately upon the death of Tissaphernes, he was in office by 392 BCE, when he made war on Evagoras of Salamis on the orders of Artaxerxes. Hecatomnus therefore became satrap of Caria c. 395 – c. 392 BCE.

== Second generation ==
Hecatomnus had five children: three sons (Mausolus, Idrieus, and Pixodarus) and two daughters (Artemisia and Ada). These were arranged into two pairs of married siblings: Mausolus with Artemisia and Idrieus with Ada. Pixodarus, the youngest of the five, married outside the family. Incestuous marriages between cosanguinous siblings were uncommon in the ancient world. Because neither pair of sibling-spouses were known to have had children, it is thought that their marriages were symbolic, and helped to preserve royal power within the family. The parents of this second generation of satraps may themselves have been siblings, if Aba was the wife of Hecatomnus as well as his sister, although the evidence that this was the case is inconclusive. The five children, Hecatomnus, and a woman presumed to be Aba, are all depicted in the art of the lavish but unfinished tomb of Hecatomnus in Mylasa.

During the government of the Hecatomnids, both wife and husband ruled alongside one another, although only men are ever called satrap or issue coinage in their own names. Hecatomnid women are known to have issued laws alongside their husbands and led military actions on their own. On the deaths of Mausolus and Idrieus, Artemisia and Ada respectively assumed sole rule of Caria.

=== Mausolus and Artemisia ===
Mausolus and Artemisia II succeeded their father upon his death in 377 BCE. Of the two of them, Mausolus was the only one to put his name on coinage or ever be referred to as satrap; nonetheless, Artemisia had a limited amount of power while her brother was still alive.

Artemisia is often referred to as Artemisia II to prevent confusion with the earlier dynast also called Artemisia (I), who ruled Halicarnassus in the early fifth century BCE and played a prominent role in the Battle of Salamis during the Greco-Persian Wars. Artemisia I was a member of the Lygdamid dynasty who were prominent in Caria c. 520 – c. 450 BCE.

Early in their joint reign, Mausolus and Artemisia moved the Hecatomnid capital to Halicarnassus, the former seat of the Lygdamids. The best-known monument of the Hecatomnids is the Mausoleum at Halicarnassus, the grand tomb of Mausolus, which became famous as one of the Seven Wonders of the Ancient World.

Alongside building projects, Mausolus and Artemisia expanded their political authority in the region of Caria, gaining control of Lycia after the Revolt of the Satraps and Greek islands of the Dodecanese such as Rhodes after their participation in the Social War against Athens.

Mausolus' long reign ended upon his death in 353/2 BCE. He was succeeded by Artemisia, who ruled alone for two years until c. 351/0 BCE. During her short reign, she suppressed a revolt by the Rhodians, personally leading a fleet to the island and installing a statue of herself in their capital city.

=== Idrieus and Ada I ===
Idrieus and Ada I succeeded Artemisia II upon her death in c. 351/0 BCE. The two appear to have ruled in a similar manner to Mausolus and Artemisia before them. Only Idrieus is named on coinage, in inscriptions, and as satrap, but Ada otherwise appears alongside him in much dynastic iconography and in some inscriptions. For example, Idrieus and Ada were depicted either side of Zeus Labraundeus, the chief god of the Hecatomnid dynasty, in a relief from Tegea in the Peloponnese.

Idrieus is perhaps best known for his investment in the sanctuary of Labraunda, a religious centre in the mountains above Mylasa. Annual processions from the city to the sanctuary became a centrepiece of dynastic cult activity. It was here that Mausolus was nearly assassinated towards the end of his reign. There are many Greek inscriptions from Labraunda which mark the dedication of new buildings by the dynasts. This record shows that Idrieus built many more buildings at the site than Mausolus. A monumental fourth-century built tomb at Labraunda may belong to Idrieus.

Ada I became the sole ruler of Caria in c. 344/3 BCE, when Idrieus died. Little is known about the four years in which she ruled alone.

=== Pixodarus, Orontobates, and Ada I's second reign ===
The reign of Ada I came to an abrupt end when she was deposed by her last living sibling, Pixodarus, in c. 341/0 BCE. As Pixodarus became satrap in Halicarnassus, Ada was exiled to the fortress of Alinda in northern Caria.

Pixodarus is best known for the Letoon trilingual, a decree of his establishing the civic cult of Caunus throughout Lycia, which was inscribed in three languages: Greek, Lycian, and Aramaic. He was also notable for being the only Hecatomnid to strike gold coins. These issues, which used the Persian daric weight standard, may have been a response to a shortage of silver in Caria.

Pixodarus did not marry within the Hecatomnid family, unlike his other siblings. He married a noblewoman from Cappadocia called Aphneis. Together they had at least one child. This daughter, named Ada, is often referred to as Ada II to distinguish her from her aunt, Ada I. Plutarch tells us that Pixodarus approached Philip II of Macedon while he was satrap, seeking an alliance with the Macedonian by marrying Ada II to Philip's eldest son Arrhidaeus; Philip's younger son, the future Alexander the Great, was reportedly offended, and the proposition eventually came to nought.

Ada II eventually married a Persian nobleman named Orontobates. On the death of Pixodarus in 336/5 BCE, Orontobates succeeded him outright as satrap, potentially after a joint period of joint rule over Caria. There is no evidence that Ada II had any authority alongside her husband, unlike Artemisia II or Ada I before her. Orontobates' brief reign was dominated by the invasion of the Achaemenid Empire by the Macedonians.

Alexander the Great entered Anatolia in 334 BCE. After a victory at the Battle of the Granicus in Northwestern Anatolia, the Greco-Macedonian army moved down the Aegean coast, capturing key sites such as Sardis and Miletus, before coming to Caria. Tradition purports that Ada I then came to Alexander from her fortress in Alinda and adopted him as her son, so that he would succeed to the rule of Caria. In return, Alexander installed her as queen of Caria after ousting Orontobates. He accomplished this during the Siege of Halicarnassus, which Ada I took a leading role in.

Ada I was left to rule Caria from Halicarnassus on Alexander's behalf as he continued his conquests. She then disappears from the historical record, and may have died at any point between 334 and 323 BCE, when Philoxenus was satrap of Caria. Asander, a Macedonian, became satrap of Caria after the Partition of Babylon, the division of Alexander's empire upon his death in 323 BCE. The Hecatomnid dynasty had come to an end.

== Ruling members ==
- Hyssaldomus, father of Hecatomnus, dynast of Mylasa
- Hecatomnus, the first satrap, ruled c. 395 – c. 377 BCE
- Mausolus and Artemisia II, intermarried son and daughter of Hecatomnus, ruled together c. 377 – c. 353 BCE
- Artemisia II, widow of Mausolus, ruled alone c. 353 – c. 351 BCE
- Idrieus and Ada I, intermarried son and daughter of Hecatomnus, ruled c. 351 – c. 344 BCE
- Ada I, widow of Idrieus, ruled alone c. 344 – c. 340 BCE
- Pixodarus, son of Hecatomnus, ruled c. 340 – c. 335 BCE
- Orontobates, Achaemenid Satrap, husband of Ada II (daughter of Pixodarus), ruled c. 335 – c. 334 BCE
- Ada I, rule alone for a second time, c. 334 – c. 320s BCE, under Alexander the Great

== Family tree ==
The Hecatomnid Dynasty

Hyssaldomus
Hecatomnus | Aba
Mausolus | Artemisia II | Idrieus | Ada I | Pixodarus | Aphneis of Cappadocia
Orontobates | Ada II

== Bibliography ==
- Simon Hornblower, Mausolus, Clarendon Press, 1982, ISBN 9780198148449
- "Hecatomnid dynasty" at livius.org
