= 334 BC =

334 BC in various calendars
- Gregorian calendar: 334 BC; CCCXXXIV BC
- Ab urbe condita: 420
- Ancient Egypt era: XXXI dynasty, 10
- Pharaoh: Darius III of Persia, 3
- Ancient Greek Olympiad (summer): 111th Olympiad, year 3
- Assyrian calendar: 4417
- Balinese saka calendar: N/A
- Bengali calendar: −927 – −926
- Berber calendar: 617
- Buddhist calendar: 211
- Burmese calendar: −971
- Byzantine calendar: 5175–5176
- Chinese calendar: 丙戌年 (Fire Dog); 2364 or 2157 — to — 丁亥年 (Fire Pig); 2365 or 2158
- Coptic calendar: −617 – −616
- Discordian calendar: 833
- Ethiopian calendar: −341 – −340
- Hebrew calendar: 3427–3428
- Hindu calendars
- Vikram Samvat: −277 – −276
- Shaka Samvat: N/A
- Kali Yuga: 2767–2768
- Holocene calendar: 9667
- Iranian calendar: 955 BP – 954 BP
- Islamic calendar: 984 BH – 983 BH
- Javanese calendar: N/A
- Julian calendar: N/A
- Korean calendar: 2000
- Minguo calendar: 2245 before ROC 民前2245年
- Nanakshahi calendar: −1801
- Thai solar calendar: 209–210
- Tibetan calendar: མེ་ཕོ་ཁྱི་ལོ་ (male Fire-Dog) −207 or −588 or −1360 — to — མེ་མོ་ཕག་ལོ་ (female Fire-Boar) −206 or −587 or −1359

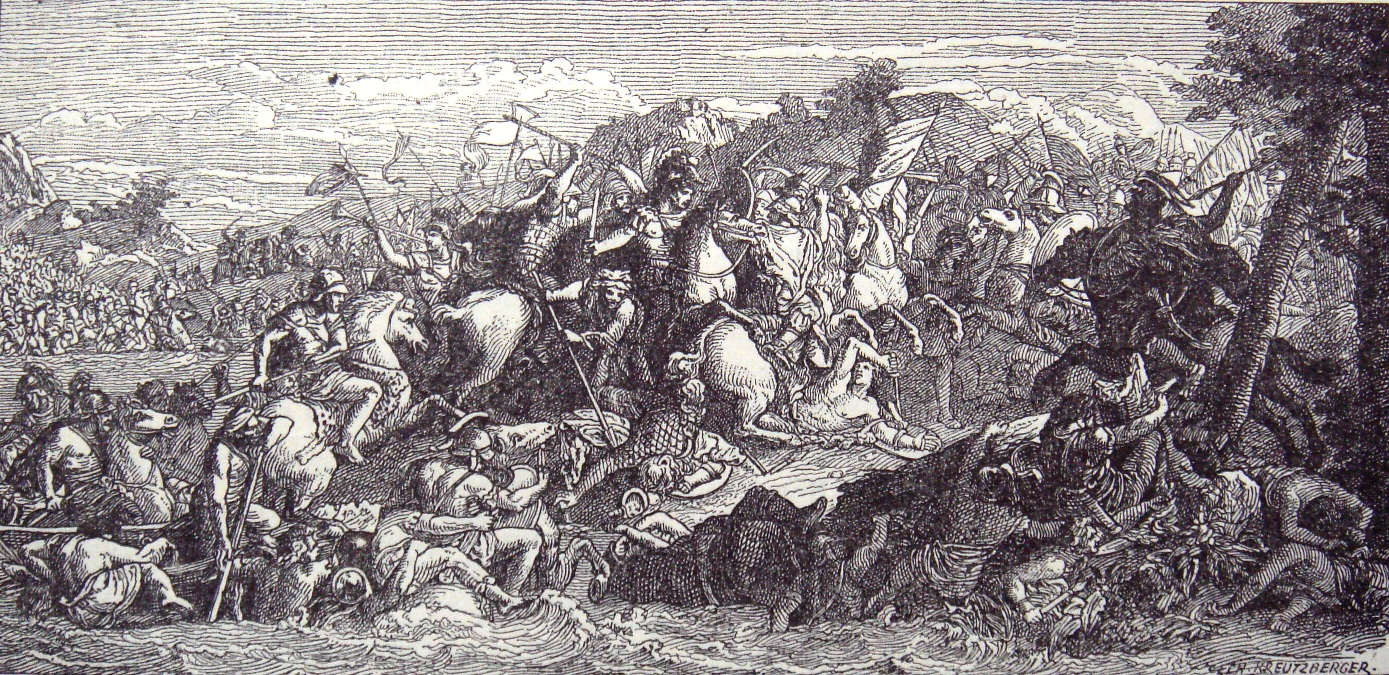
The Battle of the Granicus

Year 334 BC was a year of the pre-Julian Roman calendar. At the time, it was known as the Year of the Consulship of Caudinus and Calvinus (or, less frequently, year 420 Ab urbe condita). The denomination 334 BC for this year has been used since the early medieval period, when the Anno Domini calendar era became the prevalent method in Europe for naming years. It is the year that the Achaemenid Empire was invaded by Alexander the Great.

== Events ==
=== By place ===
==== Persian Empire ====
- The king of Caria, Pixodarus, dies and is succeeded by his son-in-law, Orontobates.
- As the Persian satraps have gathered for a war council at Zeleia, Memnon argues that it is preferable for the Persians to avoid a pitched battle and adopt a scorched earth tactic. Arsites, the satrap of Hellespontine Phrygia, will not allow his land to be burned and agrees with other satraps to reject this cautious advice.

==== Macedonia ====
- King Alexander III of Macedonia crosses the Dardanelles, leaving Antipater, who has already faithfully served his father, Philip II, as his deputy in Greece with over 13,000 men. Alexander himself commands about 30,000 foot soldiers and over 5,000 cavalry, of whom nearly 14,000 are Macedonians and about 7,000 are allies sent by the Greek League.
- May – Alexander wins a major victory against the Persians commanded by the Greek mercenary Memnon of Rhodes, in the Battle of the Granicus near the Sea of Marmara. A large number of King Darius III's Greek mercenaries are massacred, but 2,000 survivors are sent back to Macedonia in chains.
- Alexander accepts the surrender of the Persian provincial capital of Sardis (and its treasury) and proceeds down the Ionian coast.
- At Halicarnassus, Alexander successfully undertakes the first of many sieges, eventually forcing his opponents, the mercenary captain Memnon of Rhodes and the Persian satrap of Caria, Orontobates, to withdraw by sea. Alexander leaves Caria in the hands of Ada, who was the ruler of Caria before being deposed by her brother-in-law, Pixodarus.
- Alexander's victory exposes western Asia Minor to the Macedonians, and most of the cities in the region hasten to open their gates. The Ionian city of Miletus defies Alexander and he has to subdue it through a siege.

==== Italy ====
- Alexander of Epirus, at the request of the colony of Taras (Tarentum) crosses over into Italy, to aid them against the Lucanians and Bruttii. He wins victories over the Italian Samnite tribes.

==== China ====
- The rulers of Wei and Qi agree to recognize each other as kings, formalizing the independence of the Warring States and the powerlessness of the Zhou dynasty.

== Births ==
- Zeno of Citium, Greek philosopher and the father of Stoicism (approximate date) (d. c. 262 BC)

== Deaths ==
- Pixodarus, King of Caria
