= Ada of Caria =

4th-century BC Satrap and Queen of Caria

Ada
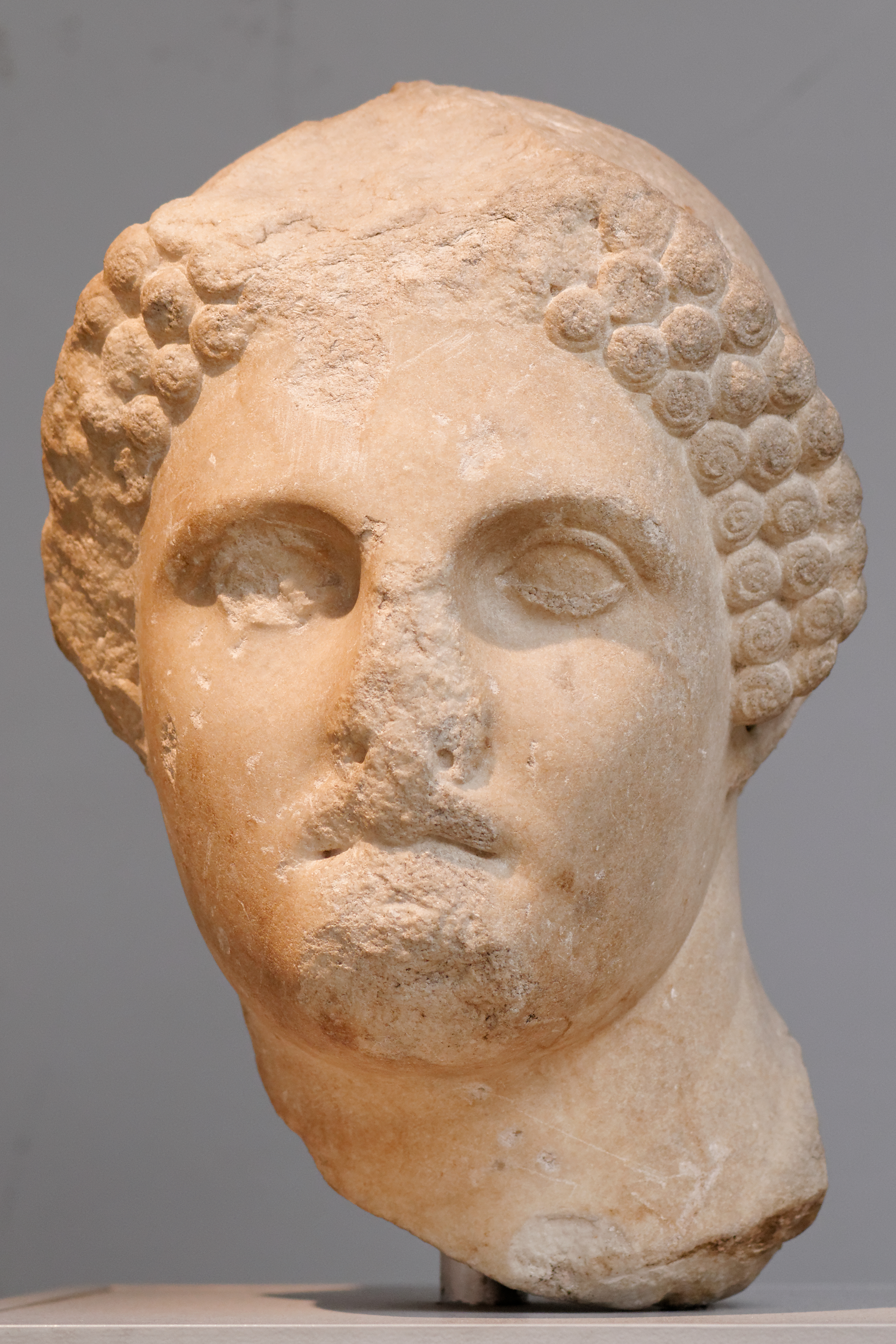
- Portrait of a young woman from the Mausoleum at Halicarnassus, sometimes identified as Ada. British Museum.

Satrap of Caria (first reign)
- Reign: 344–340 BC
- Predecessor: Idrieus
- Successor: Pixodarus

Queen of Caria (second reign)
- Reign: 334-326 BC
- Predecessor: Orontobates
- Successor: Alexander III (the Great) of Macedon
- Born: 4th century BC; Mobolla, Persian Empire (modern-day Muğla, Turkey)
- Died: 326 BC; Halicarnassus, Caria (modern-day Bodrum, Muğla, Turkey)
- Consort: Idrieus
- House: Hecatomnids
- Father: Hecatomnus

Ada of Caria (Ancient Greek: Ἄδα) (fl. 377 – 326 BC) was a member of the House of Hecatomnus (the Hecatomnids) and ruler of Caria during the mid-4th century BC, first as Persian Satrap and later as Queen under the auspices of Alexander III (the Great) of Macedon.

== History ==
Ada was the daughter of Hecatomnus, satrap of Caria, sister of Mausolus, Pixodarus, Artemisia, and Idrieus.

While Ada's father is known to have been Hekatomnos, the identity of her mother is less clear. There is a possibility that her mother might have been Aba, daughter of Hyssaldomos and a sister of Hekatomnos. This view however is challenged by scholars who believe either that the sibling marriages of the Hecatomnids were purely symbolic in nature and that while Ada was attested as his consort, it is not known if she was the mother of Hekatomnos's children.

Four of the siblings intermarried: Mausolus wed Artemisia, while Ada was married to her brother Idrieus. Pixodarus married outside of the family. Every child of Hecatomnus would govern over Caria at some point. Mausolus and Artemisia first ruled together, and after Mausolus' death, Artemisia ruled alone until she died in 351 BC.

Idrieus and Ada ruled together for seven years, until his death. During their rule, they kept close ties to the Hellenic world. The joint regents were mentioned as donors to the Temple of Athena in Tegea, and seem to have also been major patrons of Delphi. After the death of her husband, Ada became the sole satrap of Caria, but was expelled by her brother Pixodarus in 340 BC. Upon his death in 335 BC, was succeeded by his own son-in-law, the Persian Orontobates. Ada fled to the fortress of Alinda, where she maintained her rule in exile.

When Alexander the Great entered Caria in 334 BC, Ada adopted Alexander as her son and surrendered Alinda to him. Alexander accepted her offer and, in return, gave Ada formal command of the Siege of Halicarnassus. After the fall of Halicarnassus, Alexander returned Alinda to Ada and made her queen of all of Caria. Ada's popularity with the populace in turn ensured the Carians' loyalty to Alexander.

"Ada meanwhile held only Alinda, the strongest fortress in Caria; and when Alexander entered Caria she went to meet him, surrendering Alinda and adopting Alexander as her son. Alexander gave Alinda to her charge, and did not reject the title of son, and when he had taken Halicarnassus and became master of the rest of Caria, he gave her command of the whole country."

— Arrian, Anabasis, 1.23.8

She was under the protection of Asander, Hellenistic satrap of Lydia.

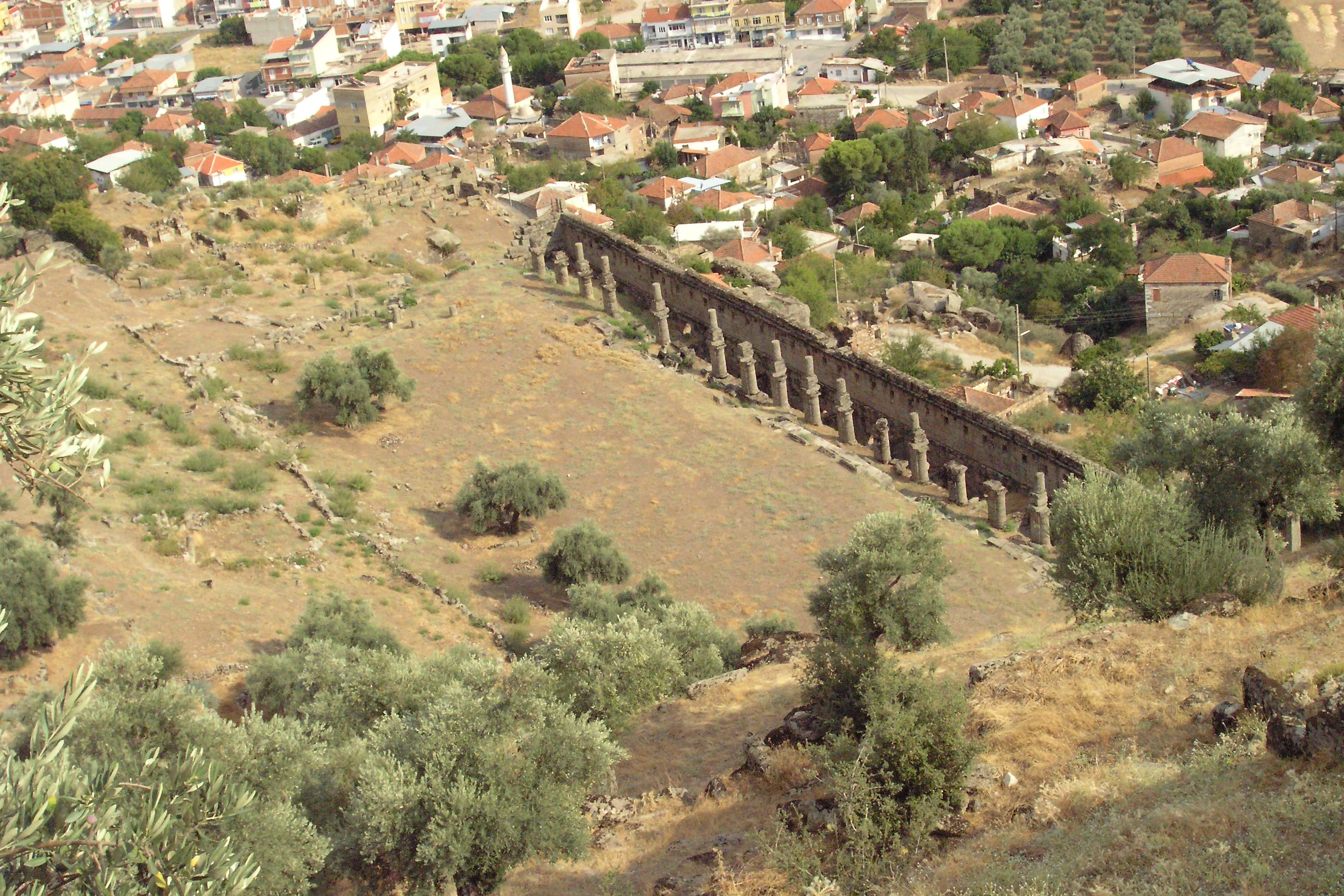
Agora of Alinda, Ada's Stronghold.

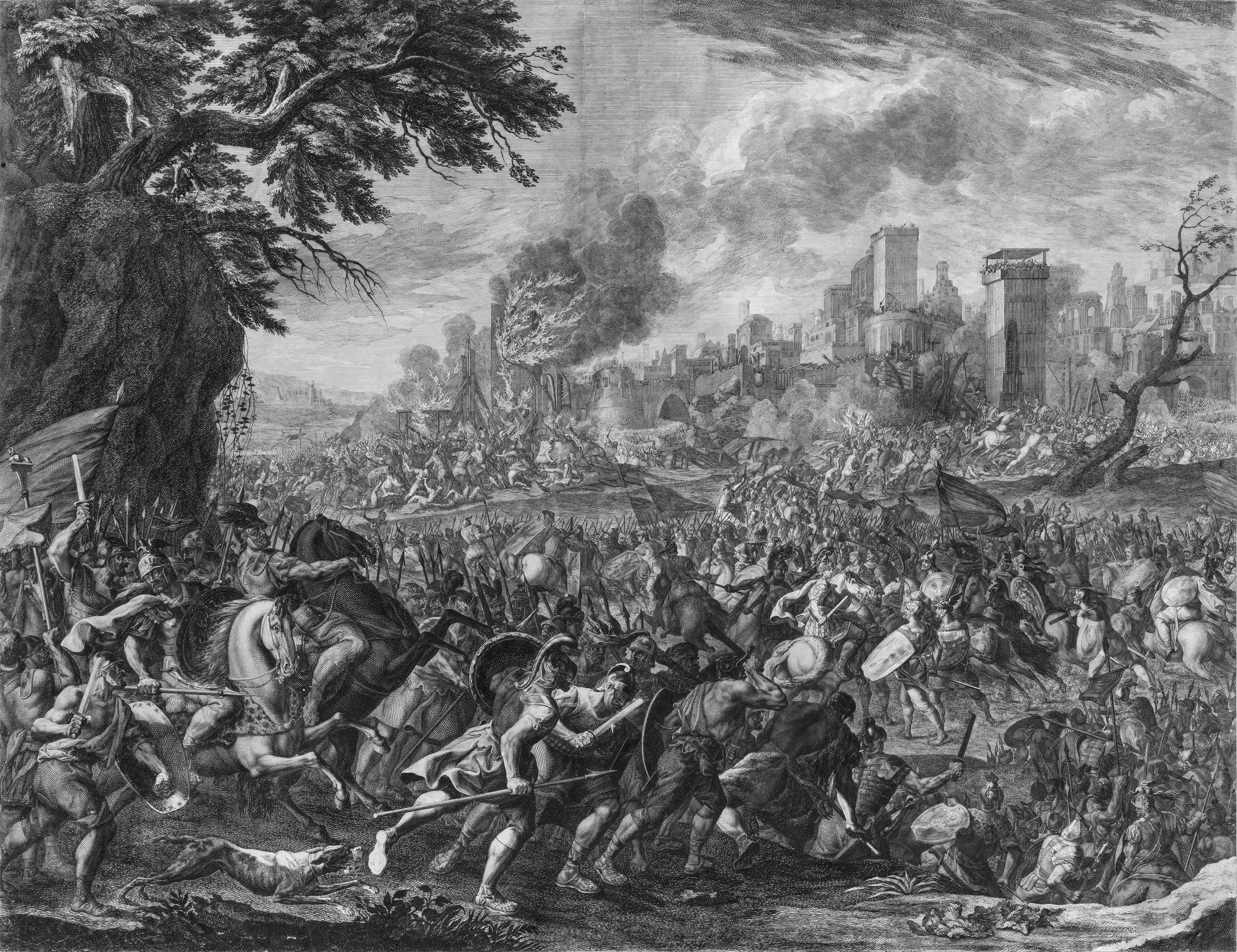
The siege and capture of Halicarnassus under Alexander the Great

== Ada sarcophagus ==
According to Turkish archaeologists, the tomb of Ada has been discovered, although this claim remains unresolved. Her remains are on display in the archaeological museum of Bodrum.

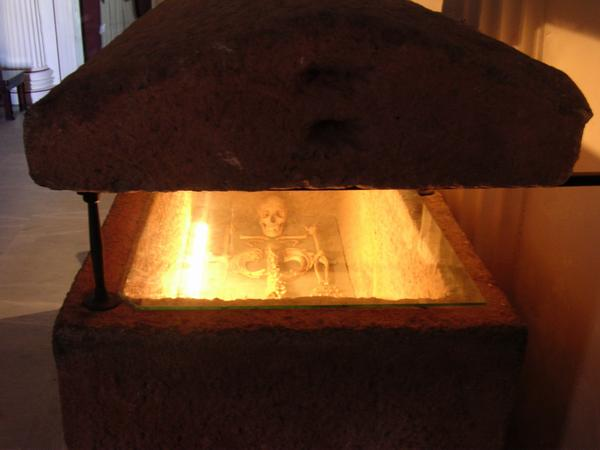
Purported skeleton of Ada, Bodrum Museum of Underwater Archaeology

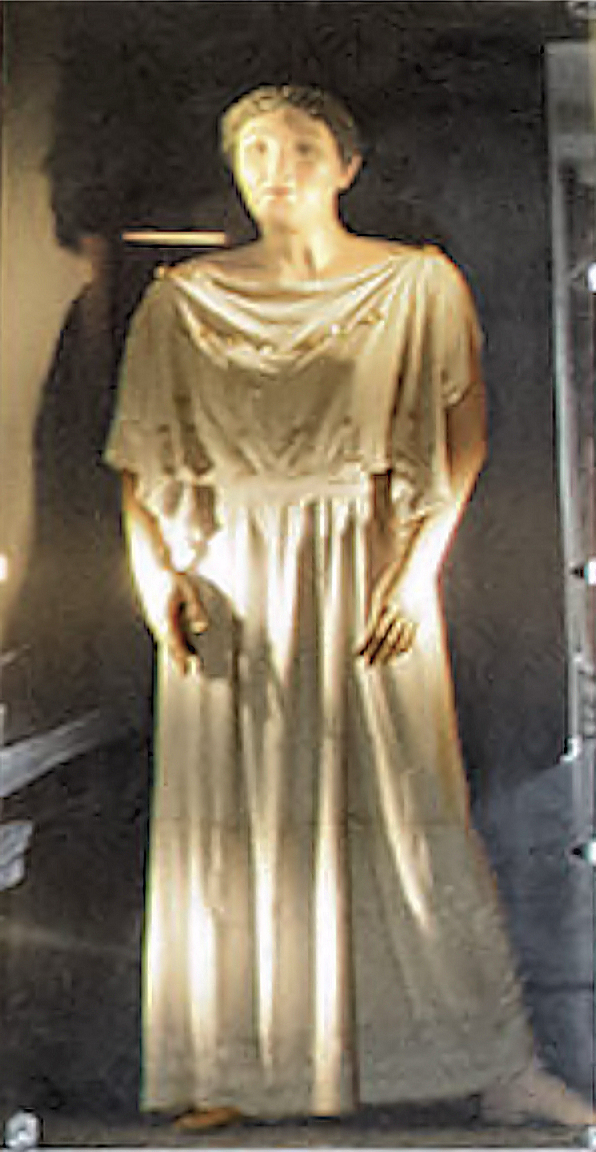
Reconstruction of Ada, Bodrum Museum. She was 1.62m tall, and about 40 years old when she died.

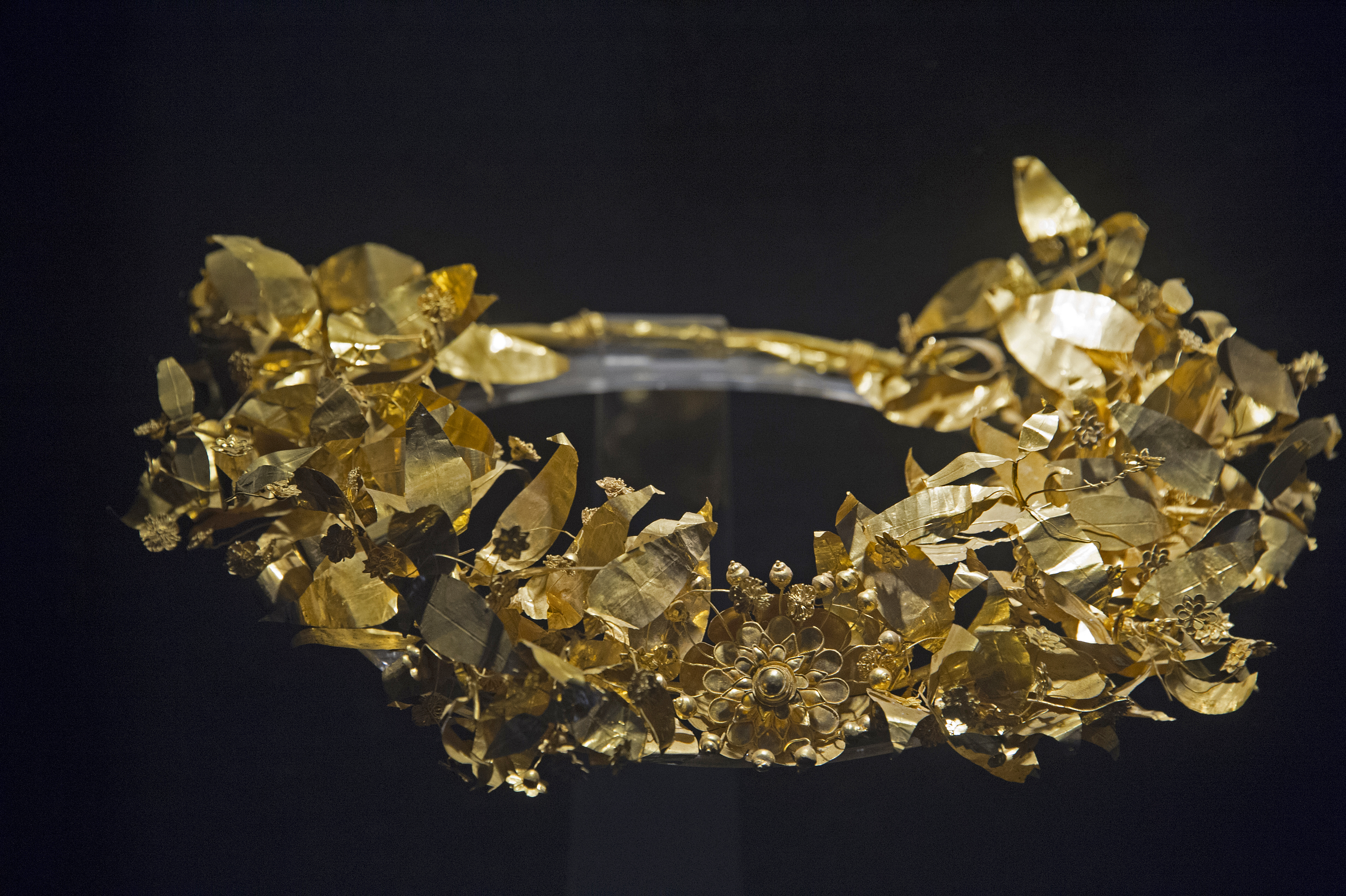
Wreath of Ada, Bodrum Museum of Underwater Archaeology

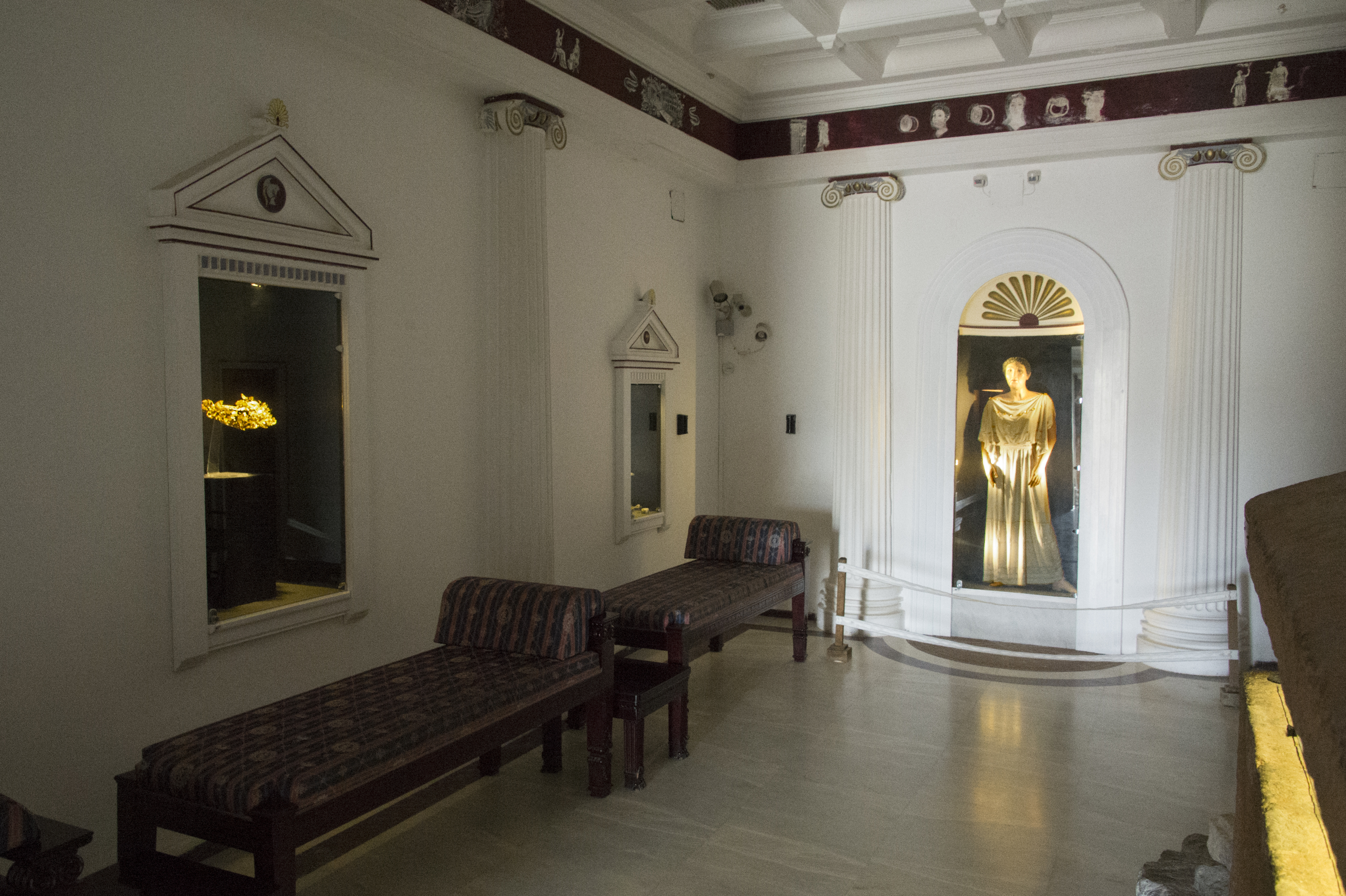
Room dedicated to the Carian Princess in the Bodrum Museum.

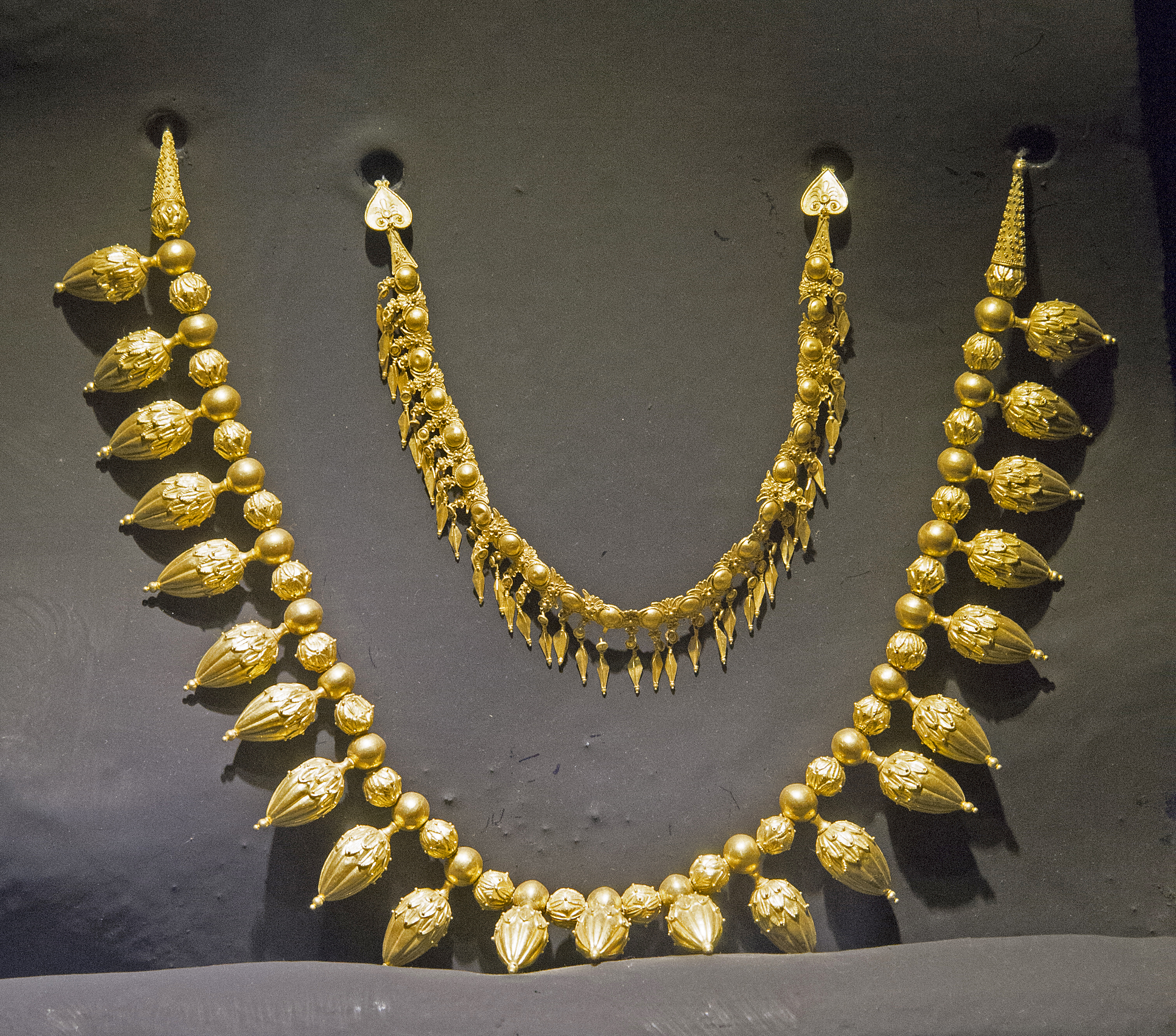
Jewelry worn by the princess in the sarcophagus.

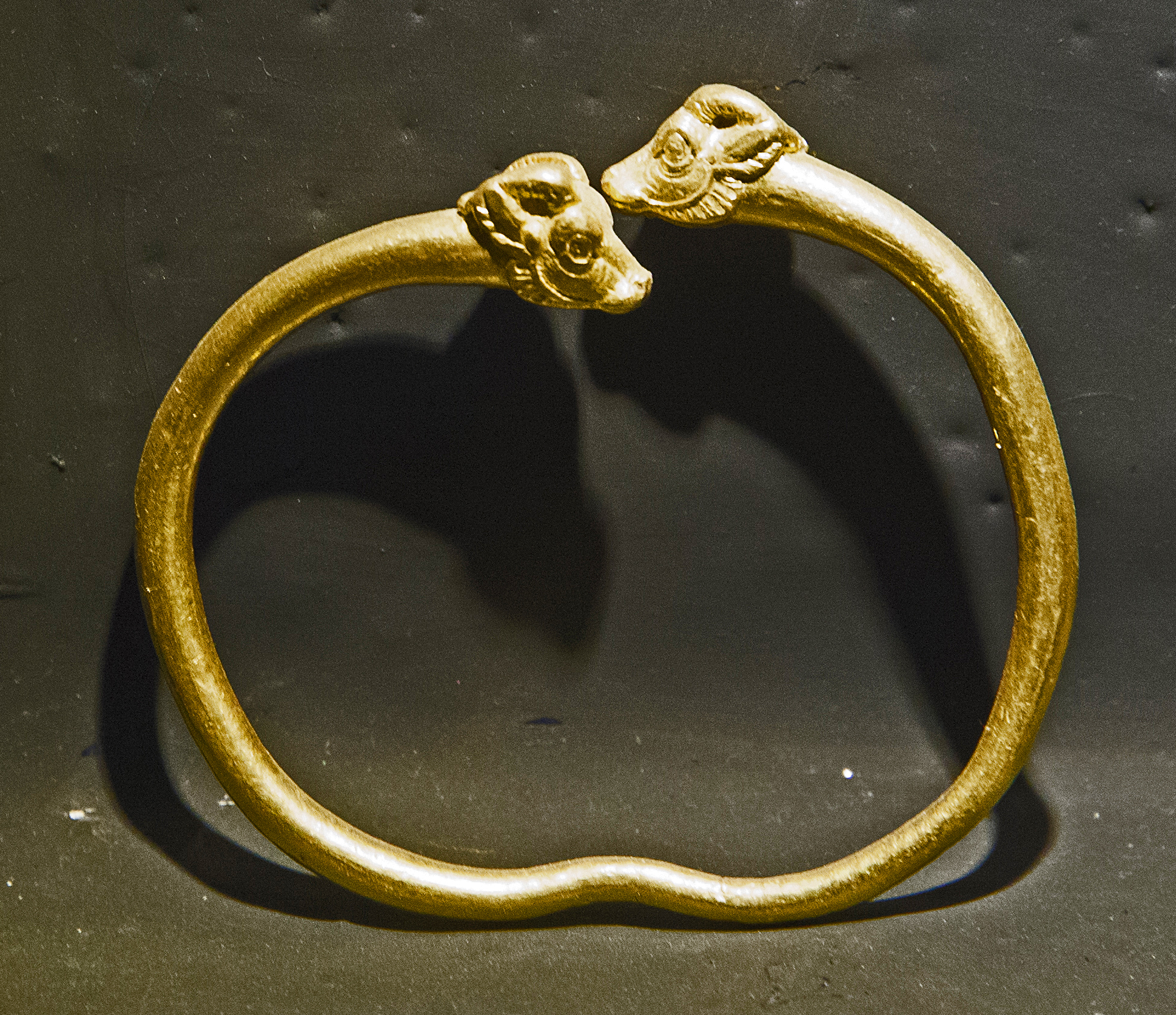
Jewelry worn by the princess in the sarcophagus.

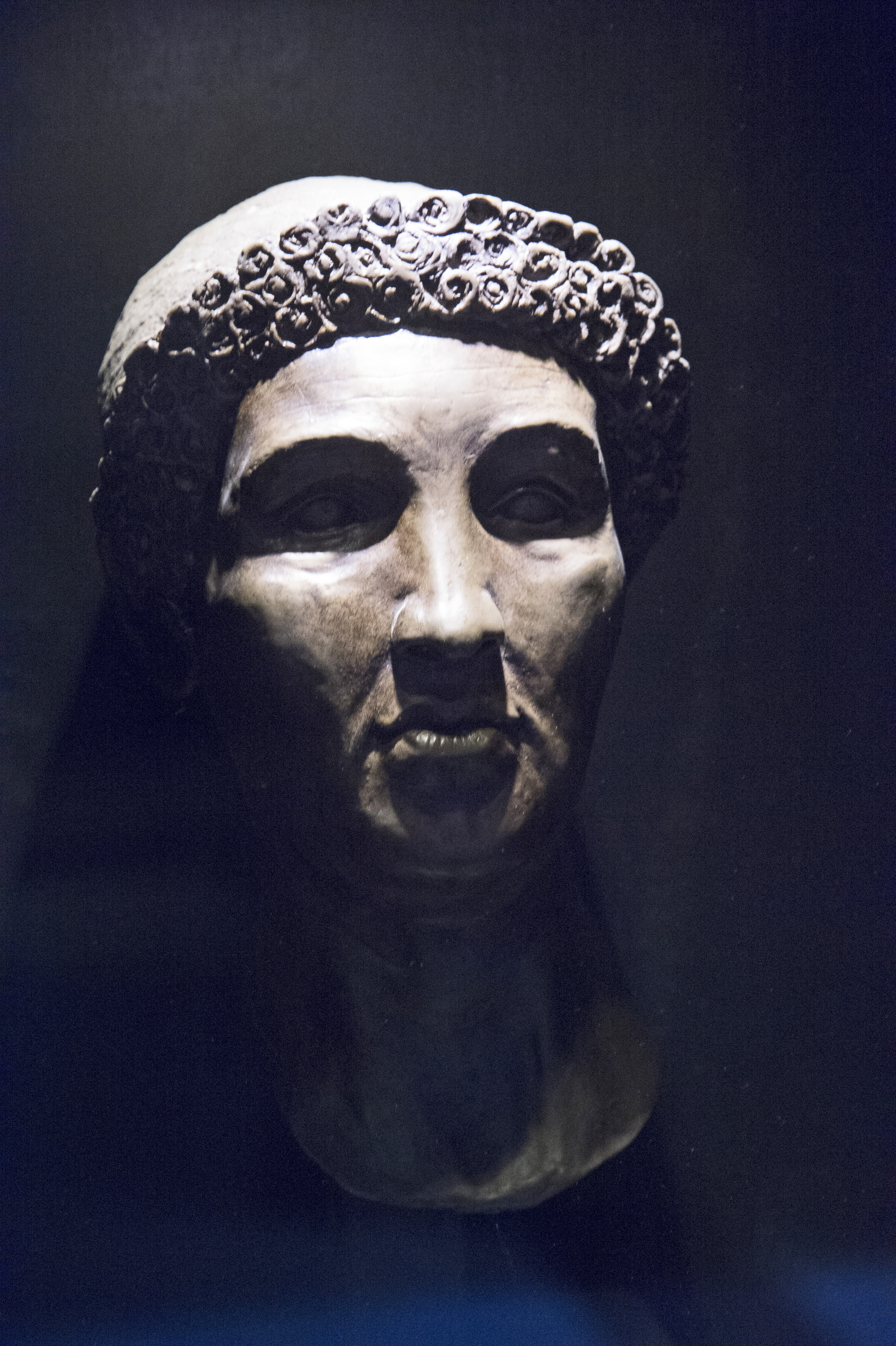
Reconstruction of the head of the deceased, aged about 40.

== Cultural depictions of Ada ==
Ada appears as a character in the young adult book Voice of Gods (2015) by Eleanor Herman.
