= 334 (disambiguation) =

334 may refer to:

- The year 334 or the year 334 BC
- 334 (number)
- 334 (novel)
- 334 Chicago, a main-belt asteroid
