= Siege of Halicarnassus =

Siege by Alexander the Great in 334 BC

- Part of the Wars of Alexander the Great
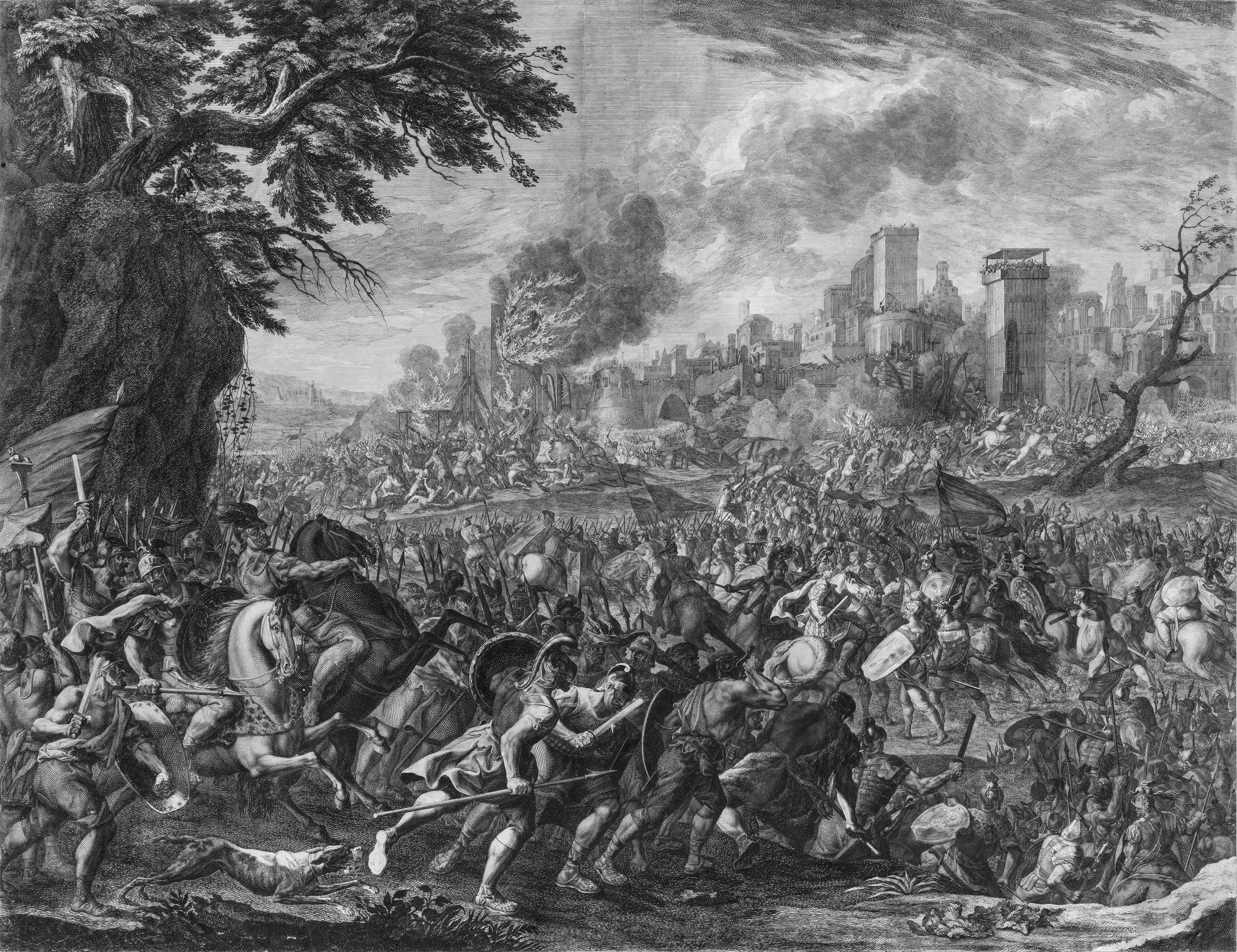
- The siege and capture of Halicarnassus under Alexander the Great
Date	334 BC
Location	Halicarnassus (modern-day Bodrum, Turkey) 37.0333°N 27.4333°E
Result	Macedonian victory
Territorial changes	Alexander captures Caria

Belligerents
Macedonia; Hellenic League	Achaemenid Empire

Commanders and leaders
Alexander the Great	Orontobates; Memnon of Rhodes

Casualties and losses
16	170
- Location of the siege of Halicarnassus

Alexander the Great
current battle

The siege of Halicarnassus was fought between Alexander the Great and the Achaemenid Persian Empire in 334 BC. Alexander, who had no navy, was constantly being threatened by the Persian navy. It continuously attempted to provoke an engagement with Alexander, who would not oblige them. Eventually, the Persian fleet sailed to Halicarnassus, in order to establish a new defense. Ada of Caria, the former queen of Halicarnassus, had been driven from her throne by her younger brother Pixodarus of Caria. When Pixodarus died, Persian King Darius had appointed Orontobates satrap of Caria, which included Halicarnassus in its jurisdiction. On the arrival of Alexander in 334 BC, Ada, who was in possession of the fortress of Alinda, surrendered the fortress to him.

Orontobates and Memnon of Rhodes entrenched themselves in Halicarnassus. Alexander had sent spies to meet with dissidents inside the city, who had promised to open the gates and allow Alexander to enter. When his spies arrived, however, the dissidents were nowhere to be found. A small battle resulted, and Alexander's army managed to break through the city walls. Memnon, however, now deployed his catapults, and Alexander's army fell back. Memnon then deployed his infantry, and shortly before Alexander would have received his first defeat, his infantry managed to break through the city walls, surprising the Persian forces. Memnon, realising the city was lost, set fire to it and withdrew with his army. Strong winds caused the fire to destroy much of the city. Alexander, leading his army through the gates, ordered crews to extinguish the blazing structures and issued a decree that the citizens should not be harmed.

== Aftermath ==
After the capture of Halicarnassus Alexander sent his newly married soldiers home to spend the winter with their families. Alexander committed the government of Caria to Ada, and she, in turn, formally adopted Alexander as her son, ensuring that the rule of Caria passed unconditionally to him upon her eventual death. During her husband's tenure as satrap, Ada had been loved by the people of Caria. By putting Ada, who felt very favourably towards Alexander, on the throne, he ensured that the government of Caria, as well as its people, remained loyal to him.

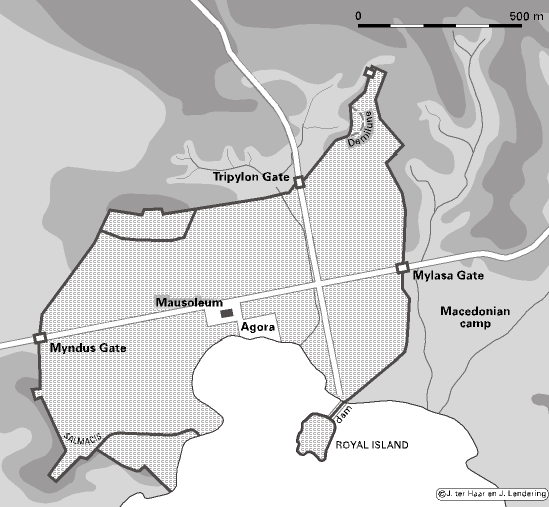
Map of Halicarnassus at the time of the siege

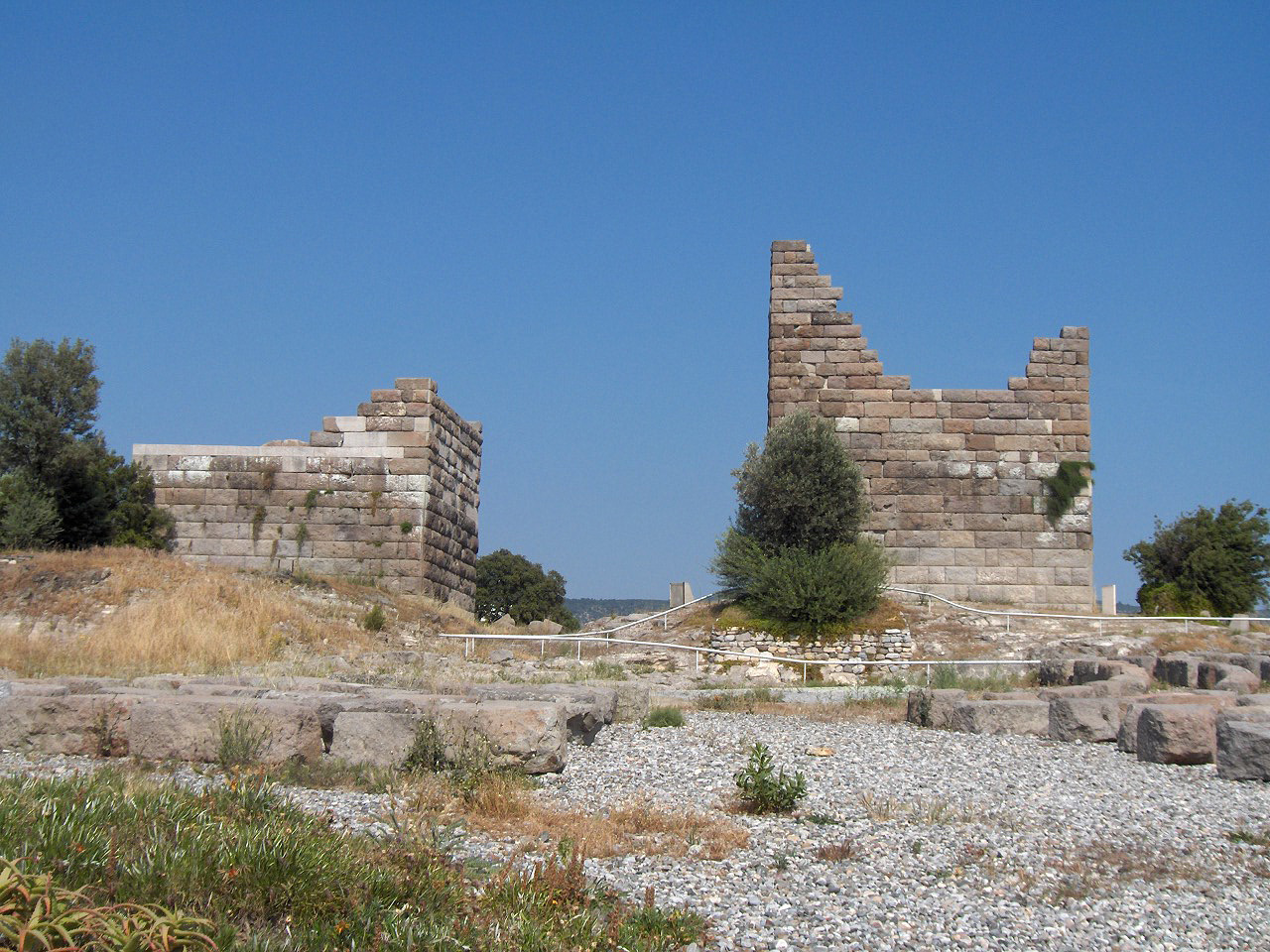
Ruins of the fortications around Halicarnassus (the Myndus Gate), 4th century BC

== Bibliography ==
- Cartledge, Paul. Alexander the Great: The Hunt for a New Past. Woodstock, NY; New York: The Overlook Press, 2004 (hardcover, ISBN 1-58567-565-2); London: PanMacmillan, 2004 (hardcover, ISBN 1-4050-3292-8); New York: Vintage, 2005 (paperback, ISBN 1-4000-7919-5).
- Fuller J.F.C The Generalship of Alexander The Great. New Brunswick, NJ : Da Capo Press, 2004 (ISBN 0-306-81330-0).
- English Stephen. The Sieges of Alexander the Great. Pen and Sword, 2010 (ISBN 9781848840607)
