= Idrieus =

Satrap of Caria from 351 BC to 344 BC

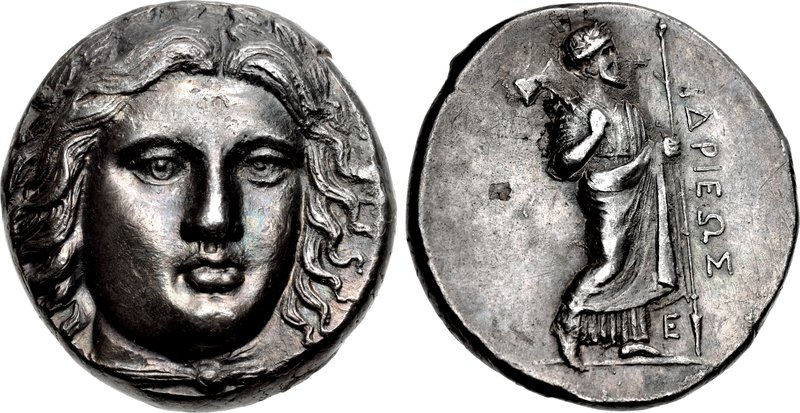
- Coinage of Idrieus. Obv: Head of Apollo wearing laurel wreath, drapery at neck. Rev: legend ΙΔΡΙΕΩΣ ("IDRIEOS"), Zeus Labraundos standing. Circa 351/0 to 344/3 BCE.

Satrap of Caria
- Reign: 351–344 BC,
- Predecessor: Artemisia II
- Successor: Ada
- Born: 4th century BCE.
- Died: 344 BCE. Halicarnassus, Caria, Persian Empire (modern-day Bodrum, Muğla, Turkey)
- Consort: Ada
- House: Hecatomnids
- Father: Hecatomnus

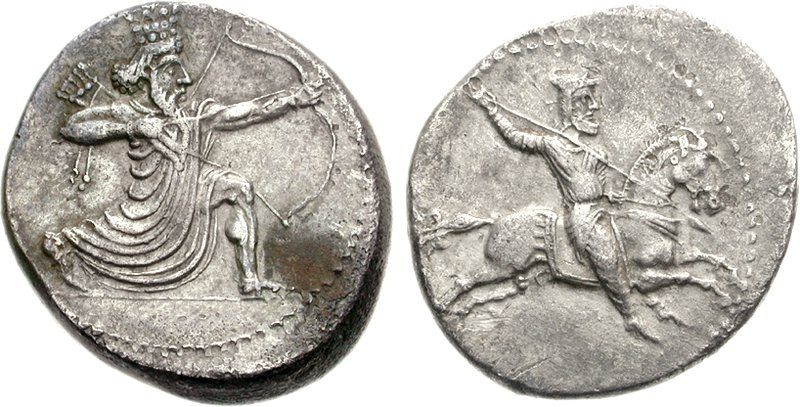
Achaemenid coinage of Caria during the reign of Idrieus. Circa 350-341 BC.

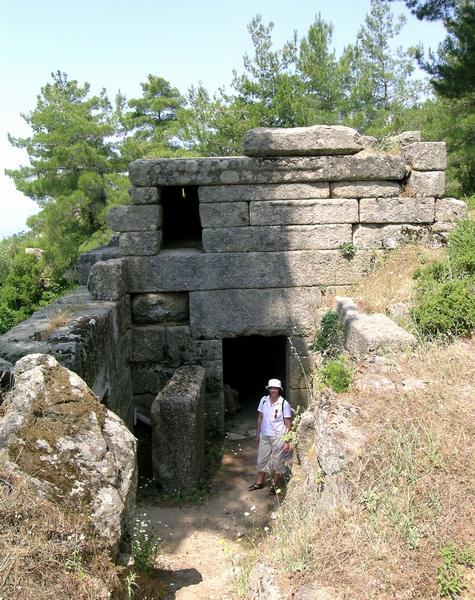
Tomb of Idrieus in Labraunda (present day Turkey)

Idrieus, or Hidrieus (Ancient Greek: Ἱδριεύς, romanized: Hidrieús; died 344 BC) was a ruler of Caria as a Satrap under the Achaemenid Empire. Alongside his sister and wife Ada, he enjoyed the status of king or dynast by virtue of the powerful position he inherited from his predecessors of the House of Hecatomnus (the Hecatomnids).

== Biography ==
Idrieus was the second son of Hecatomnus, and was married to his sister Ada. Alongside Ada, he succeeded to the throne on the death of his sister Artemisia II of Caria in 351 BC.

Shortly after his accession he was required by the Persian king, Artaxerxes III Ochus, to provide arms and troops for the capture of Cyprus, a request with which he readily complied. He equipped a fleet of 40 triremes and assembled an army of 8000 mercenary troops. These were despatched for use against Cyprus under the command of Evagoras and the Athenian general Phocion. This is the only recorded event preserved from his reign. However; it can be inferred from Isocrates that by 346 BC the friendly relations between Idrieus and the Persian king had not continued and there appears to have been open hostility between the two.

But the hostility of Persia did not interfere with Caria's prosperity, for in the same passage by Isocrates, Idrieus is described as one of the most wealthy and powerful of the princes of Asia and Demosthenes advises that Idrieus had added the important islands of Chios, Cos, and Rhodes to his hereditary dominions.

Idrieus was an active builder, as attested in Halicarnassus. He may have finished the Mausoleum, the tomb of his brother Mausolus, begun by their sister, Mausolus' wife, and his own immediate predecessor, Artemisia II, which had been left unfinished at her death. He was active at Labraunda, where he continued the Hellenistic style construction begun there earlier by Hecatomnus and Mausolus. Inscriptions show that he dedicated the temple of Zeus, the southern and eastern entrances (propyla), and built the so-called 'Doric house' (oikos). Unlike Mausolus, Idrieus called himself 'Mylasan' (Ancient Greek: Ιδριεὺς Ἑκατόμνω Μυλασεὺς) in his inscribed dedications, emphasising his local roots. Some of these dedications may therefore have predated his reign as satrap; it has been theorised that Idrieus and Ada used the so-called 'Andron A' at Labraunda as a palace while Mausolus and Artemisia II were still alive.

Idrieus died of a disease in 344 BC, after a reign of seven years, and was succeeded by his sister and wife Ada. His sister shared his rule in a junior capacity throughout his life, and appeared alongside him in dynastic portraits at Mylasa, Tegea in the Peloponnese, and statues at Delphi dedicated by the people of Miletos in Caria. A remarkable Carian language inscription from Sinuri records a joint edict in both their names: 'Idrieus (son) of Hecatomnus and Ada (daughter) of Hecatomnus', [id]ryin k̂tmñoś sb ada k̂tmñoś ([𐤧𐊢]𐋈𐤧𐊵 𐊴𐊭𐊪𐊳𐊫𐊸 𐊰𐊩 𐊠𐊢𐊠 𐊴𐊭𐊪𐊳𐊫𐊸).
