= Hecatomnus =

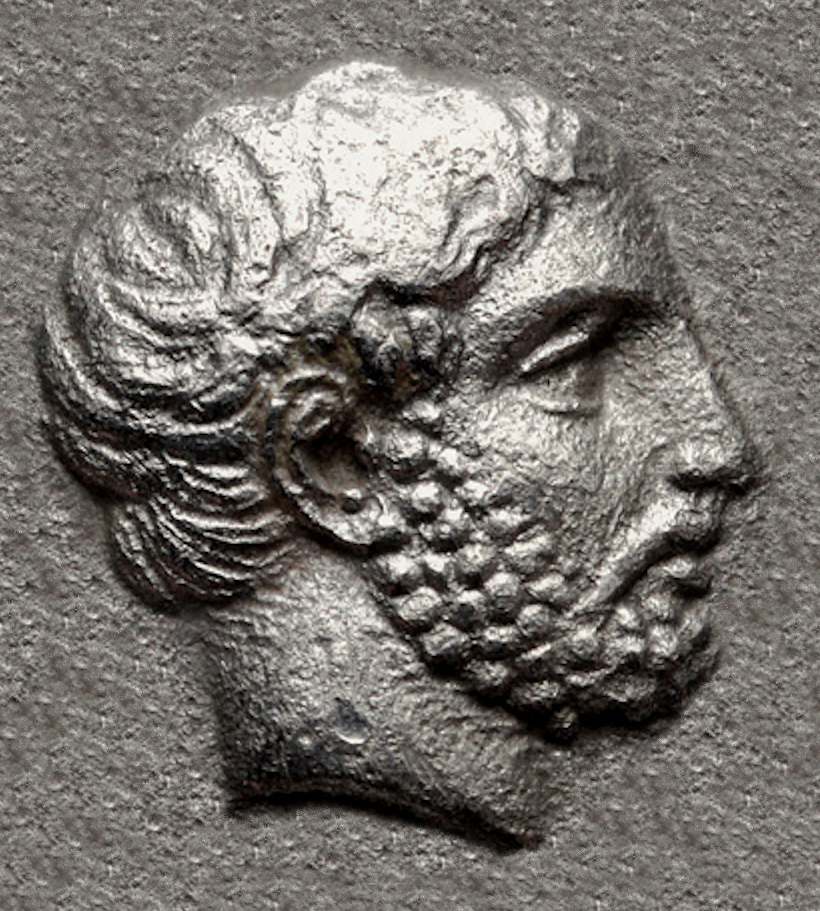
- Portrait of Hekatomnos, from his coinage, circa 392/1-377/6 BC.

Satrap of Caria
- Reign: ca. 395–377 BC
- Predecessor: Tissaphernes
- Successor: Mausolus
- Born: 5th century BCE.
- Died: 377 BCE. Halicarnassus, Caria, Persian Empire (modern-day Bodrum, Muğla, Turkey)
- Spouse: Aba, daughter of Hyssaldomus of Mylasa
- Issue Detail: Mausolus; Artemisia II; Idrieus; Ada; Pixodarus
- House: Hecatomnids
- Father: Hyssaldomus of Mylasa

Hecatomnus of Mylasa or Hekatomnos (Greek: Ἑκατόμνως, Carian: 𐊴𐊭𐊪𐊵𐊫 k̂tmno "under-son, descendant(?)") was an early 4th-century BC ruler of Caria. He was the satrap (governor) of Caria for the Persian Achaemenid king Artaxerxes II (404–358 BC). However, the basis for Hecatomnus' political power was twofold: he was both a high appointed Persian official and a powerful local dynast, who founded the hereditary dynasty of the Hecatomnids. The Hecatomnids followed the earlier autochthonous dynasty of the Lygdamids (520–450 BC) in Caria.

== Biography ==
Hecatomnus was the son and successor of Hyssaldomus, a dynastic ruler of Mylasa. It is likely that Hecatomnus had been a supporter of Tissaphernes and might have been employed by him in the subordinate office of hyparch.

At some time after 395 BC Hecatomnus became the first satrap of Caria, which was until then part of other satrapies, usually that of Lydia. The designation of Caria as a separate satrapy was part of a reorganization of Persian power in western Anatolia by Artaxerxes II in the aftermath of Cyrus's revolt. Hecatomnus was the first non-Persian official to be elevated to the position of satrap.

He acceded as satrap perhaps in 394 BC, but no later than 390 BC, when he was appointed by the Persian king to command the naval forces destined to take part in the war against Evagoras I of Cyprus.

Isocrates states that he was still ruling in 380 BC. Stephen Ruzicka places his death in 377/376 BC

He left three sons, Mausolus, Idrieus and Pixodarus, and two daughters, Artemisia and Ada, who were married to their brothers, Mausolus and Idrieus, all five of whom in turn succeeded him as rulers.

== Alleged collusion with Evagoras ==
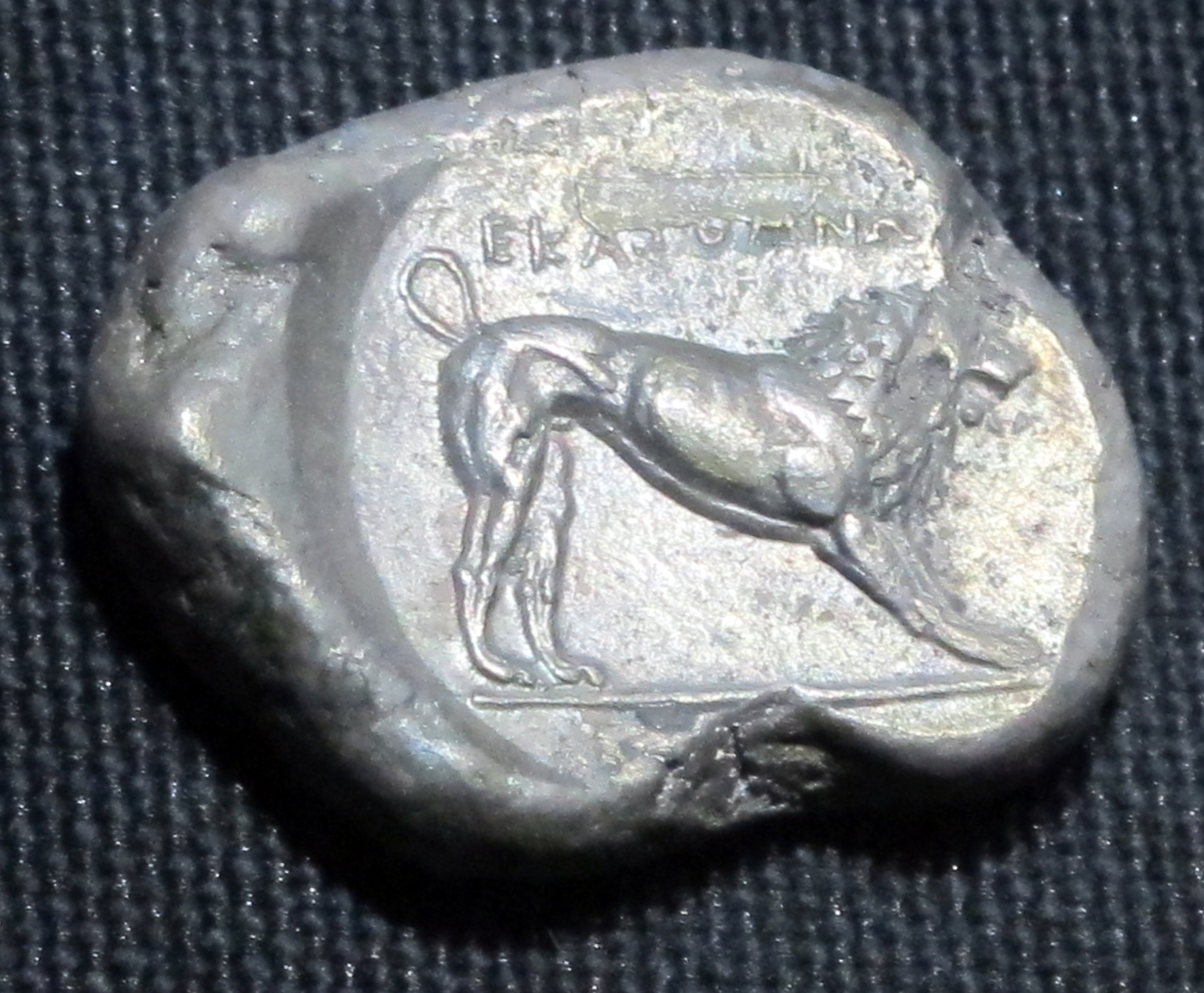
Hecatomnus coin, with legend EKATOMNΩ. Bodrum Museum of Underwater Archaeology.

Two ancient sources, Diodorus and Isocrates, report that Hecatomnus secretly supplied Evagoras with sums of money to raise mercenary troops and was in fact ready to rise against the Persian King. However, Ruzicka strongly doubts the veracity of these reports. Indeed, Hecatomnus had not shown at any other time insubordination or disaffection towards the Persian monarchy. Unlike other rebellious satraps (Cyrus the Younger or Pissuthnes, for example) Hecatomnus was not a Persian of noble or royal blood and could not hope to win the allegiance of other Persian officials. Thus, it seems highly unlikely that he would have engaged in treasonous activity without any tangible hope to benefit from it.

Ruzicka offers two possible explanations for the reports by Diodorus and Isocrates, which must have been based on some contemporary rumours. In both cases he names Evagoras as the likely source of the rumours.

1. Evagoras might have wanted to compromise Hecatomnus in the eyes of his master, Artaxerxes. Later, he managed to engineer the recall and disgrace of another satrap (Orontes) who was campaigning against him.
2. Evagoras might have wanted to create the impression that Hecatomnus was his secret ally in order to impress the Egyptian king Hakor with whom he was negotiating for support against Artaxerxes. From Egypt the rumour could have filtered to Athens through the Athenian general Chabrias who was then serving with Hakor as a military adviser.

== Coinage ==
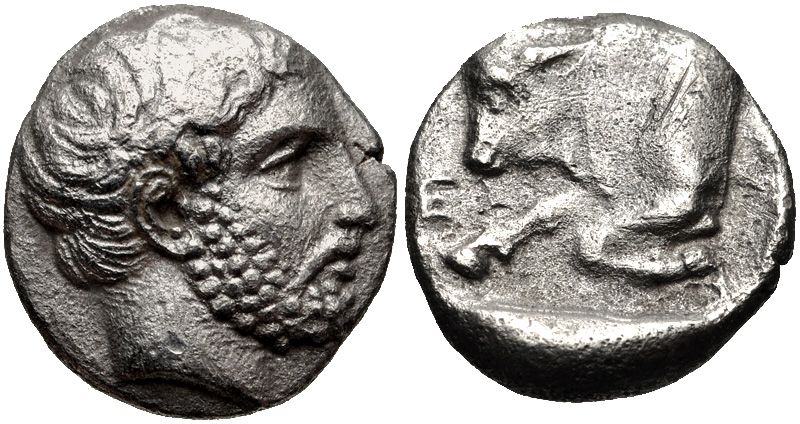
Coinage of Hekatomnos, with effigy of the Satrap. Circa 392/1-377/6 BC.

Hecatomnus was a native of Mylasa, and made that city his capital and the seat of his government. Hence the figure of Zeus Labrandenos appears on his coins walking and carrying a labrys over his shoulder, from the celebrated temple of that name near Mylasa.

== Tomb ==
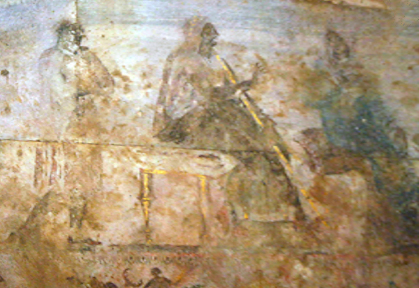
Hekatomnos tomb fresco.

In 2010 police arrested looters digging for antiquities in what later was believed to be the tomb of Hecatomnus. A marble sarcophagus and numerous frescoes were discovered in the tomb, although many relics had already been taken from the tomb and sold on the black market. The Mausoleum is in the UNESCO World Heritage Sites tentative list. It is considered very important for understanding of Carian art and craftsmanship as it was built by their best architects and sculptors and was a predecessor of the magnificent Mausoleum at Halicarnassus.

Recently a golden crown stolen from the tomb has been identified and agreed to be returned to Turkey.
