= Artemisia II of Caria =

4th-century BC female ruler of Caria

Artemisia II
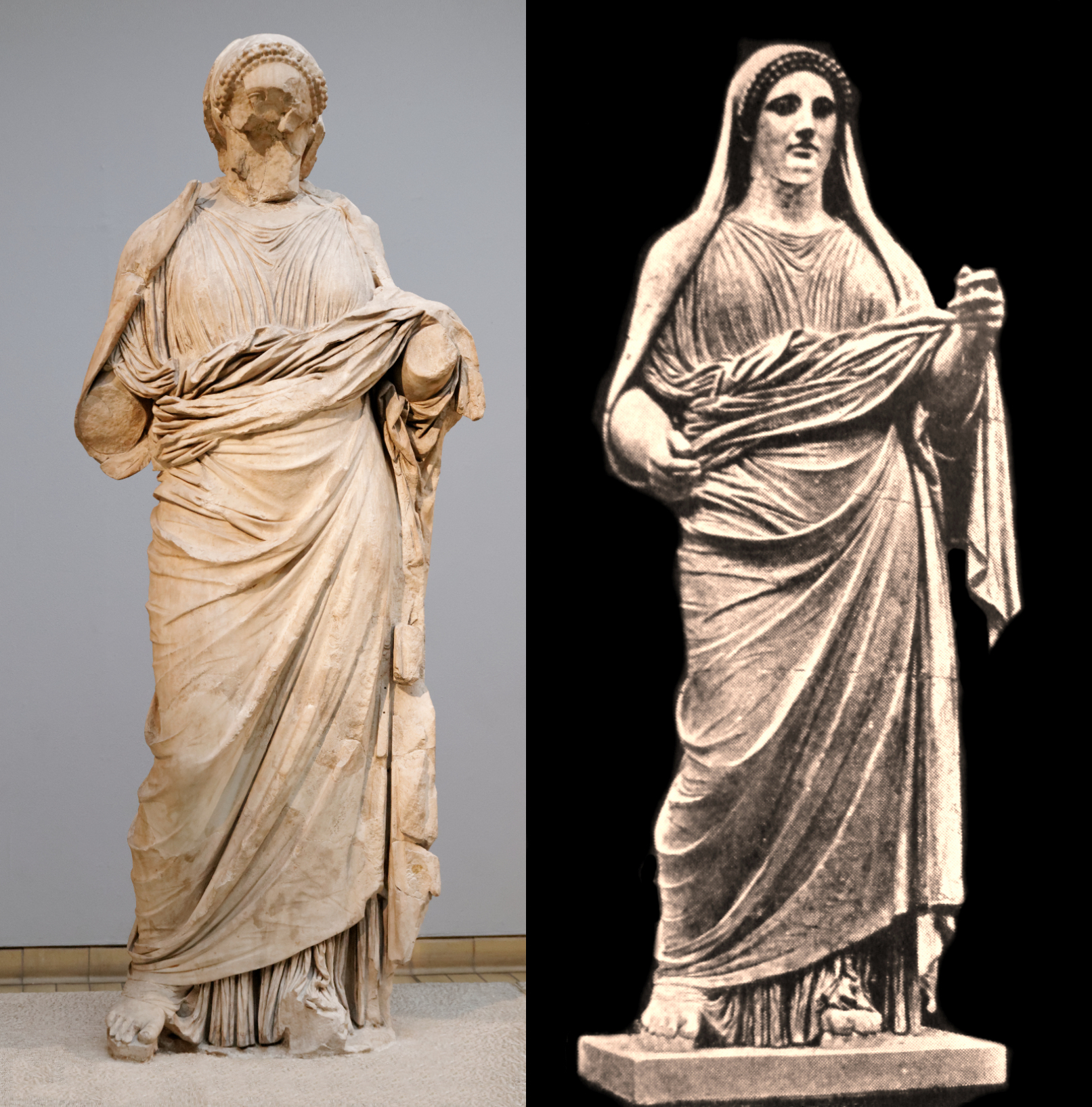
- Original and reconstitution of the statue traditionally identified as Artemisia, from the Mausoleum at Halicarnassus, now in the British Museum.

Satrap of Caria
- In office: 353–351 BCE
- Predecessor: Mausolus
- Successor: Idrieus
- Born: c. 395 BCE.
- Died: c. 351 BCE.
- Consort: Mausolus
- House: Hecatomnids
- Father: Hecatomnus
- Mother: unknown
- Religion: Greek polytheism

Artemisia II of Caria (Greek: Ἀρτεμισία; died 351 BC) was a naval strategist, commander and the sister (and later spouse) and successor of Mausolus, ruler of Caria. Mausolus was a satrap of the Achaemenid Empire, yet enjoyed the status of king or dynast of the Hecatomnid dynasty. After the death of her brother/husband, Artemisia reigned for two years, from 353 to 351 BCE. Her ascension to the throne prompted a revolt in some of the island and coastal cities under her command due to their objection to a female ruler. Her administration was conducted on the same principles as that of her husband; in particular, she supported the oligarchical party on the island of Rhodes.

Because of Artemisia's grief for her brother-husband, and the extravagant and bizarre forms it took, she became to later ages "a lasting example of chaste widowhood and of the purest and rarest kind of love", in the words of Giovanni Boccaccio. In art, she was usually shown in the process of consuming his ashes, mixed in a drink.

== Life ==
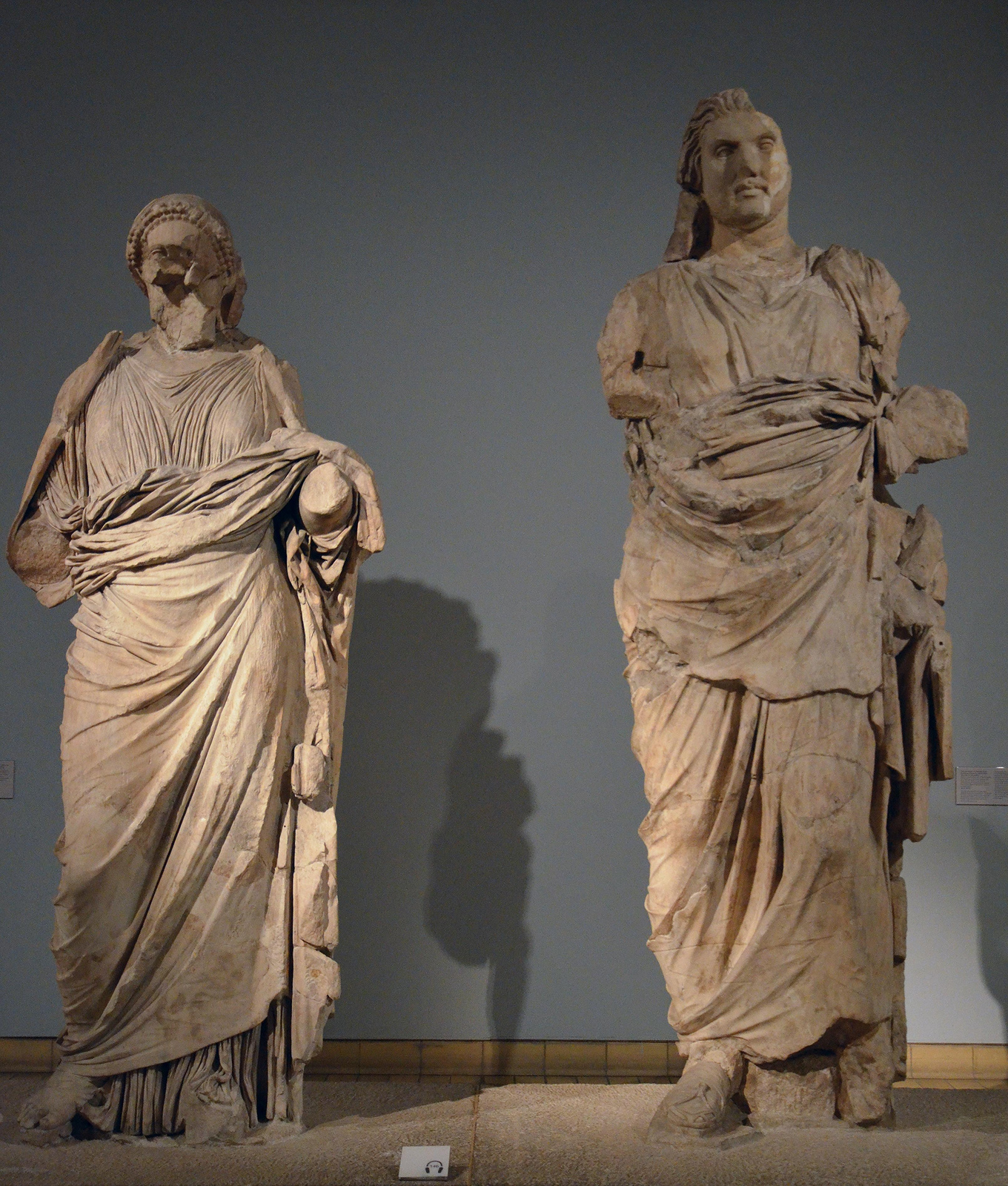
Colossal statues of a man and a woman from the Mausoleum at Halicarnassus, traditionally identified as Artemisia II and Mausolos, around 350 BCE, British Museum.

While Artemisia's father is known to have been Hekatomnos, the identity of her mother is less clear. There is a possibility that her mother might have been Aba, daughter of Hyssaldomos and a sister of Hekatomnos. This view however is challenged by scholars who believe that the sibling marriages of the Hecatomnids were purely symbolic in nature and that while Ada was attested as his consort, it is not known if she was the mother of Hekatomnos‘ children.

Artemisia is renowned in history for her extraordinary grief at the death of her husband (and brother) Mausolus. She is said to have mixed his ashes in her daily drink, and to have gradually pined away during the two years that she survived him. She induced the most eminent Greek rhetoricians to proclaim his praise in their oratory; and to perpetuate his memory she built at Halicarnassus the celebrated Mausoleum at Halicarnassus, listed by Antipater of Sidon as one of the Seven Wonders of the Ancient World and whose name subsequently became the generic term for any splendid sepulchral monument.

Artemisia is known for commanding a fleet and played a role in the military-political affairs of the Aegean after the decline in Athenian naval superiority. The island republic of Rhodes objected to the fact that a woman was ruling Caria. Rhodes sent a fleet against Artemisia without knowing that her deceased husband had built a secret harbour. Artemisia hid ships rowers, and marines and allowed the Rhodians to enter the main harbour. Artemisia and her citizens met the Rhodians at the city walls and invited them into the city. When the Rhodians began exiting their ships, Artemisia sailed her fleet through an outlet in the sea and into the main harbour. She captured empty Rhodian ships, and the Rhodian men who disembarked were killed in the marketplace. Artemisia then put her men on the Rhodian ships and had them sail back to Rhodes. The men were welcomed in the Rhodian harbour and they took over Rhodes.

Polyaenus, in the eighth book of his work Stratagems, mentions that when Artemisia (he may have been referring to Artemisia I, but more probably Artemisia II) wanted to conquer Latmus, she placed soldiers in ambush near the city and she, with women, eunuchs and musicians, celebrated a sacrifice at the sacred grove of the Mother of the Gods, which was about seven stades distant from the city. When the inhabitants of Latmus came out to see the magnificent procession, the soldiers entered the city and took possession of it.

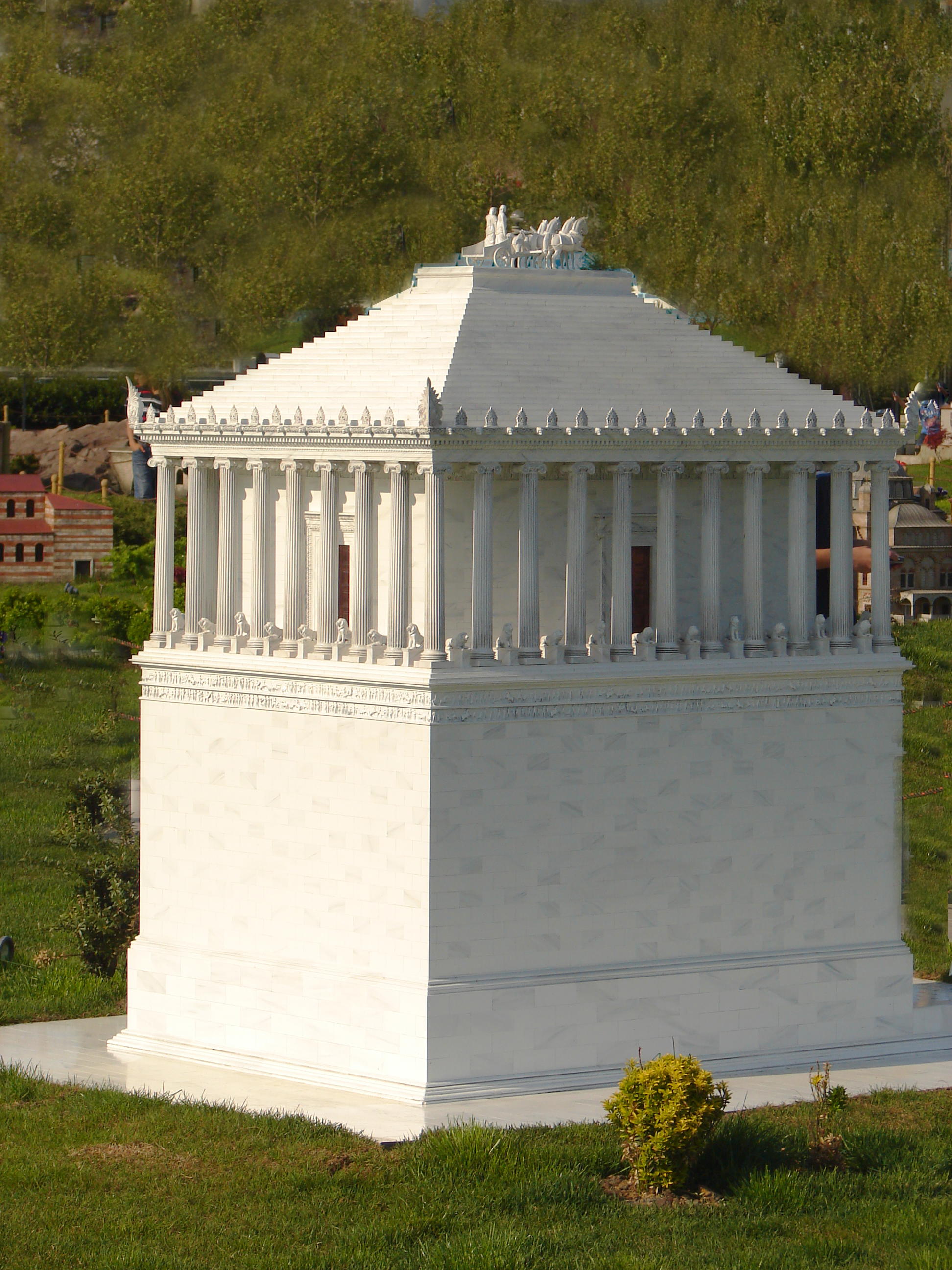
Scale model of the Mausoleum at Halicarnassus, Miniatürk, Istanbul.

== Other monuments ==
Another celebrated monument was erected by Artemisia in Rhodes to commemorate her conquest of the island. The Rhodians, after regaining their liberty, made it inaccessible, whence it was called in later times the Abaton (άβατον) which means "Do not tread" or "inaccessible". This bronze statue portrays Artemisia in the act of branding the personification of the island of Rhodes, potentially represented by the goddess Rhodos.

== In later art ==
Artemisia drinking her husband's ashes was a subject in painting from the Renaissance onwards, especially enjoying a vogue in Dutch Golden Age painting around the middle of the 17th century, being painted by Rembrandt (Prado) among others. This was probably stimulated by the publication in 1614 of a Dutch translation of the collection of anecdotes of Valerius Maximus, who was active in the reign of Tiberius. Rembrandt for one can be shown to have read and used this book.

Artemisia is always shown with a cup or urn, either alone or with a group of attendants offering or helping to mix the drink. The subject is therefore very similar to Sophonisba taking poison, and the Rembrandt, and a Donato Creti in the National Gallery, are examples of works where the intended subject remains uncertain between the two.

== Other cultural references ==
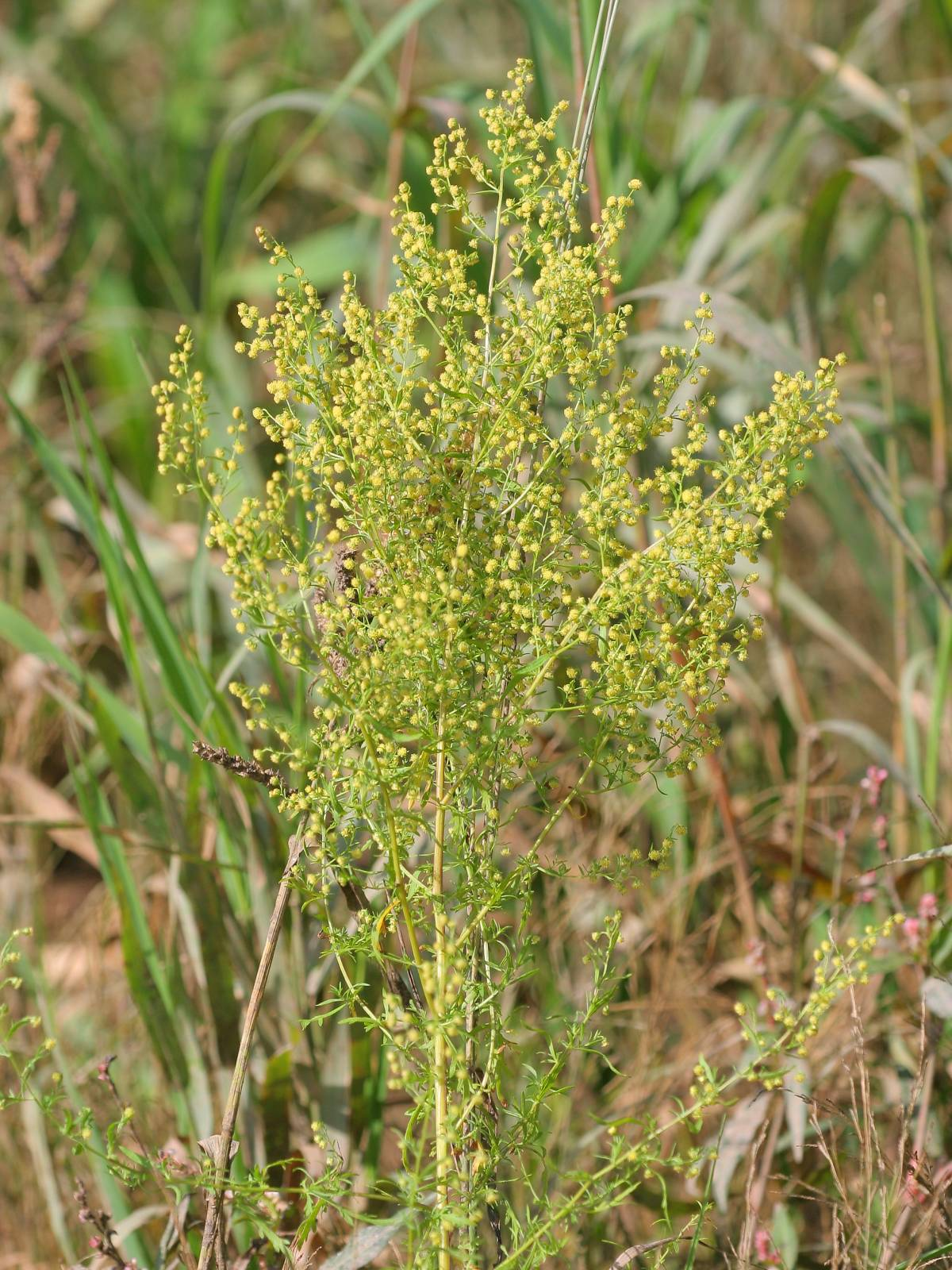
Artemisia annua.

Artemisia received a full and friendly biography in the De mulieribus claris ("On Famous Women"), a collection of biographies of historical and mythological women by the Florentine author Giovanni Boccaccio, written by 1374. Boccaccio completely omits reference to her husband being her brother ("... knowledge of her parents or native country has not reached us ..."), and praised her: "to posterity she is a lasting example of chaste widowhood and of the purest and rarest kind of love".

=== Plant genus ===
According to Pliny, the plant genus Artemisia was named after Queen Artemisia II of Caria, who was also a botanist and medical researcher. The anti-malarial drug Artemisinin, extracted from the plant variety Artemisia annua, is therefore indirectly derived from the name of Queen Artemisia II of Caria.

Mulieres quoque hanc gloriam adfectavere, in quibus Artemisia uxor Mausoli adoptata herba, quae antea parthenis vocabatur.
[Women too have been ambitious to gain this distinction, among them Artemisia, the wife of Mausolus, who gave her name to a plant which before was called parthenis.]

— Pliny the Elder, Natural History XXV.xxxvi.73

== Representations of Artemisia in art ==
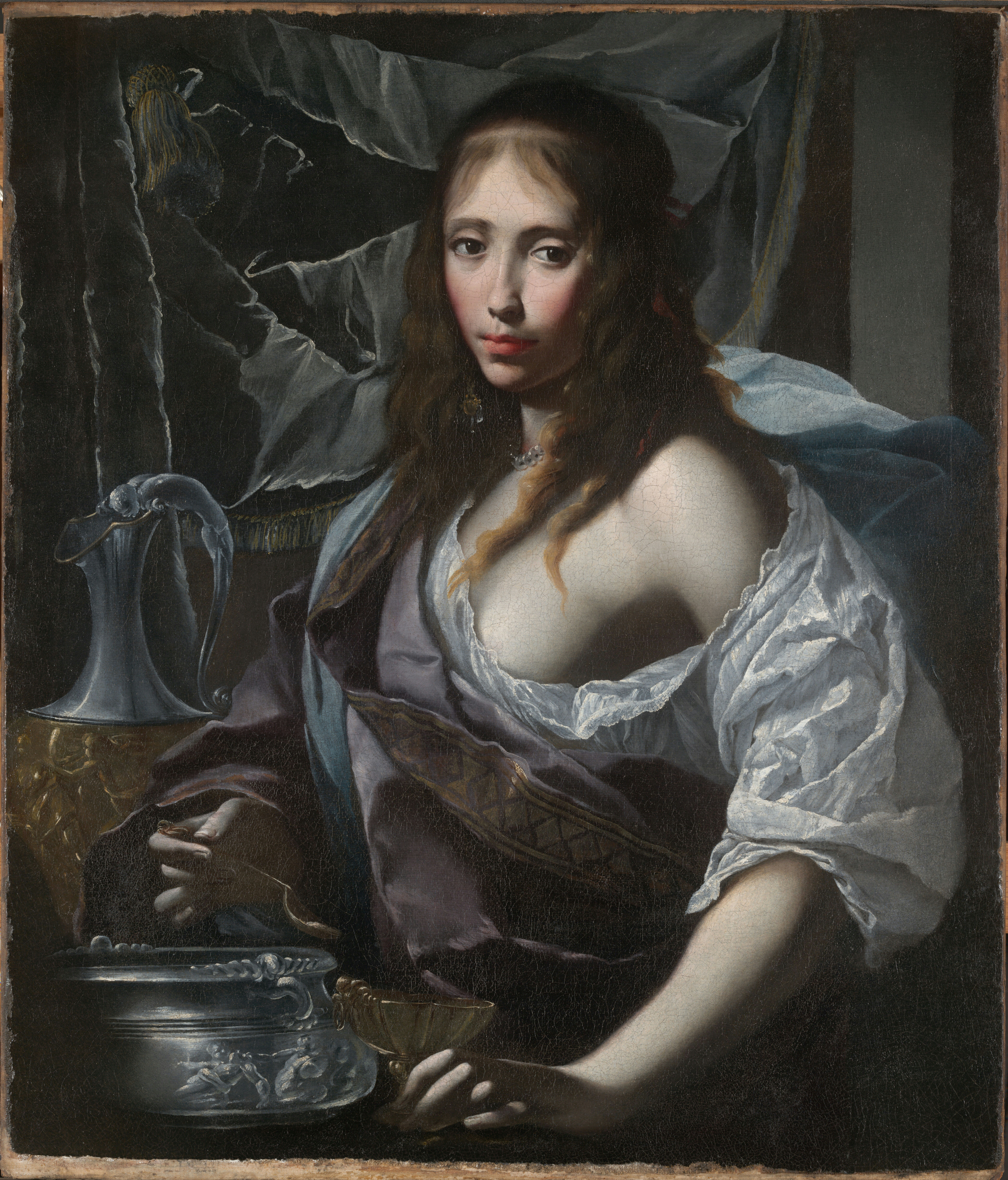
Artemisia Prepares to Drink the Ashes of her Husband, Mausolus (c.1630) by Francesco Furini.

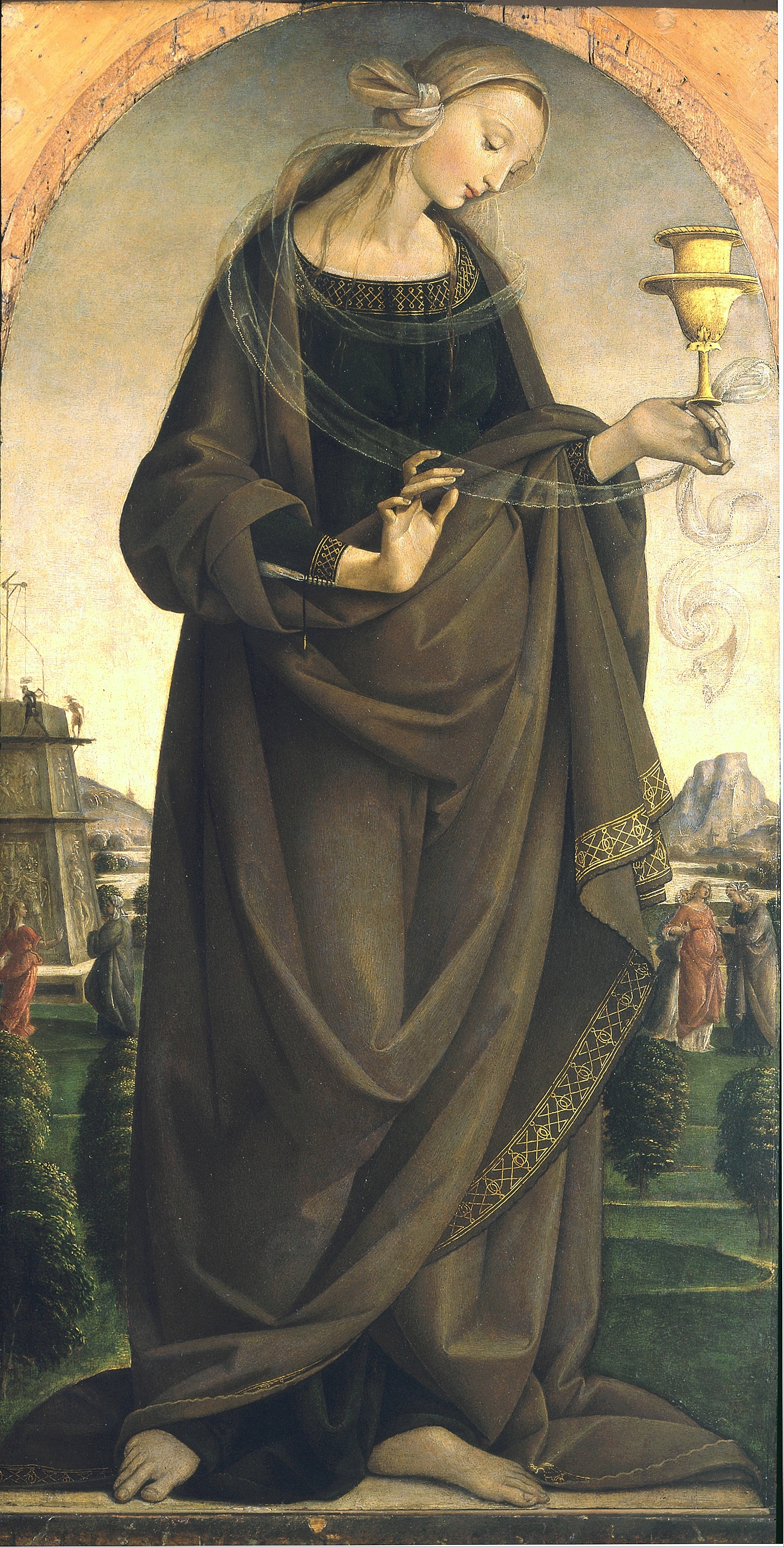
Master Of The Story Of Griselda, Siena, 15th century, one of a series of heroes and heroines who behaved well to the opposite sex.

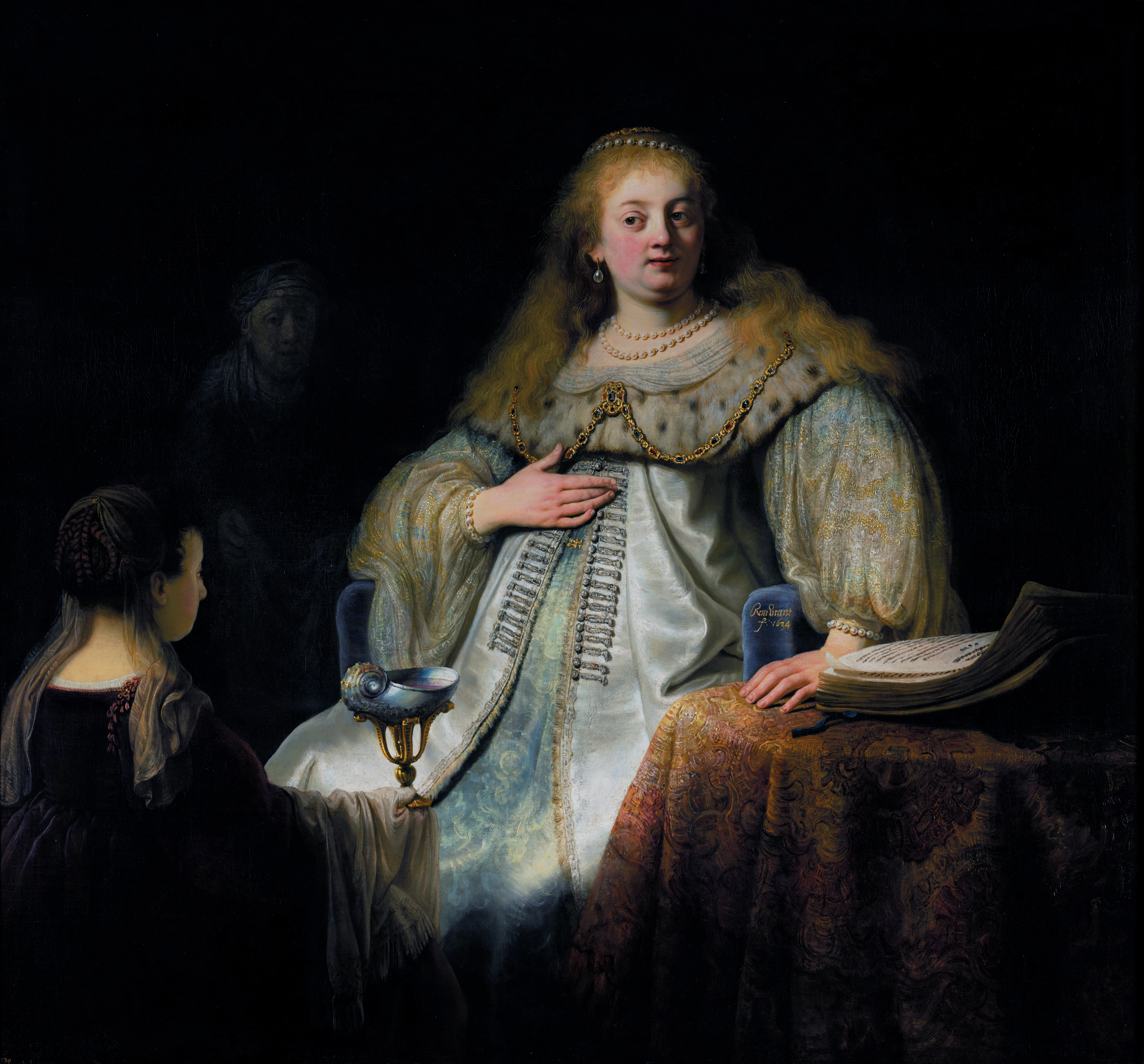
Rembrandt, about 1634 CE.

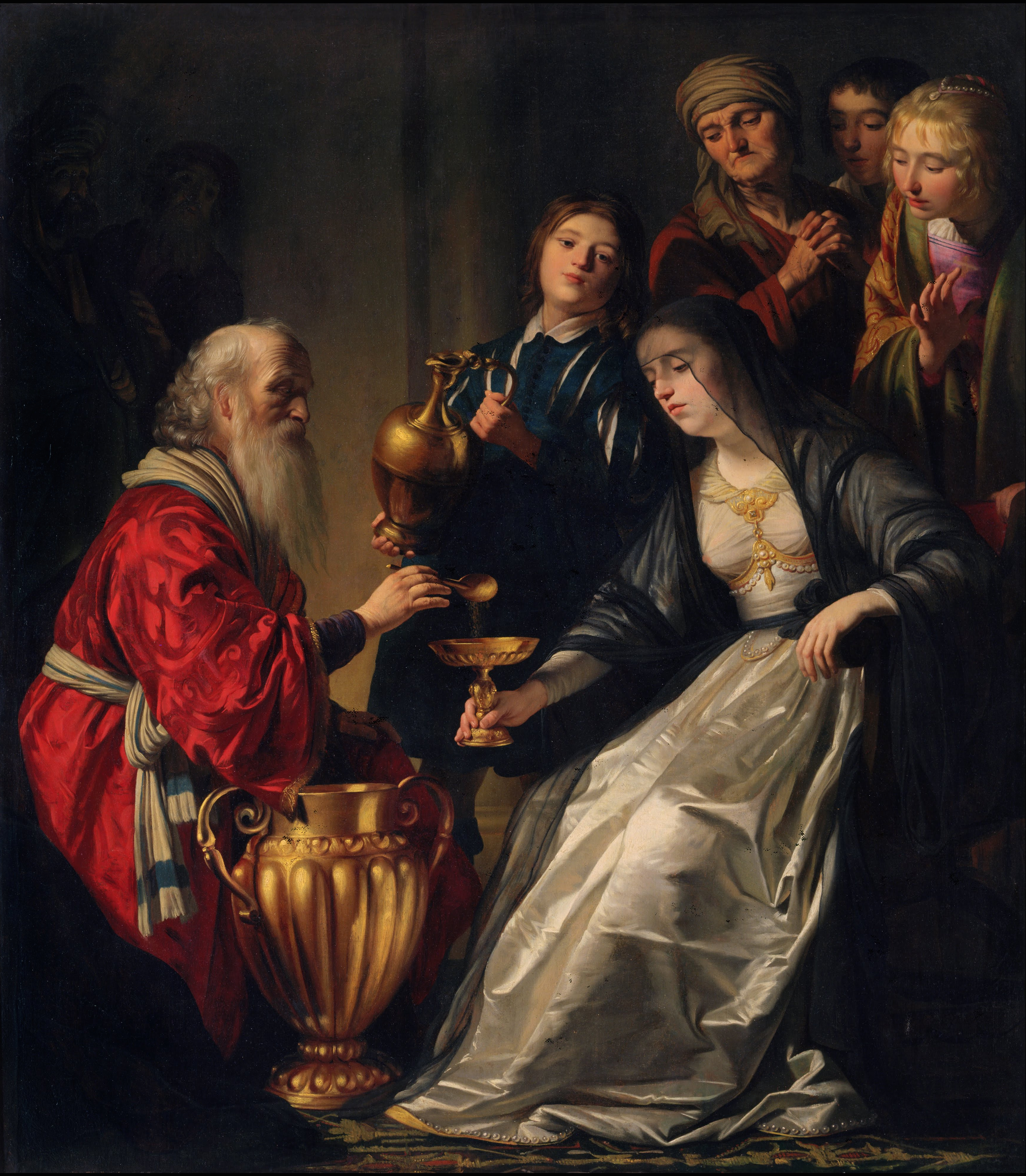
Gerrit van Honthorst, about 1635 CE, Princeton University Art Museum.

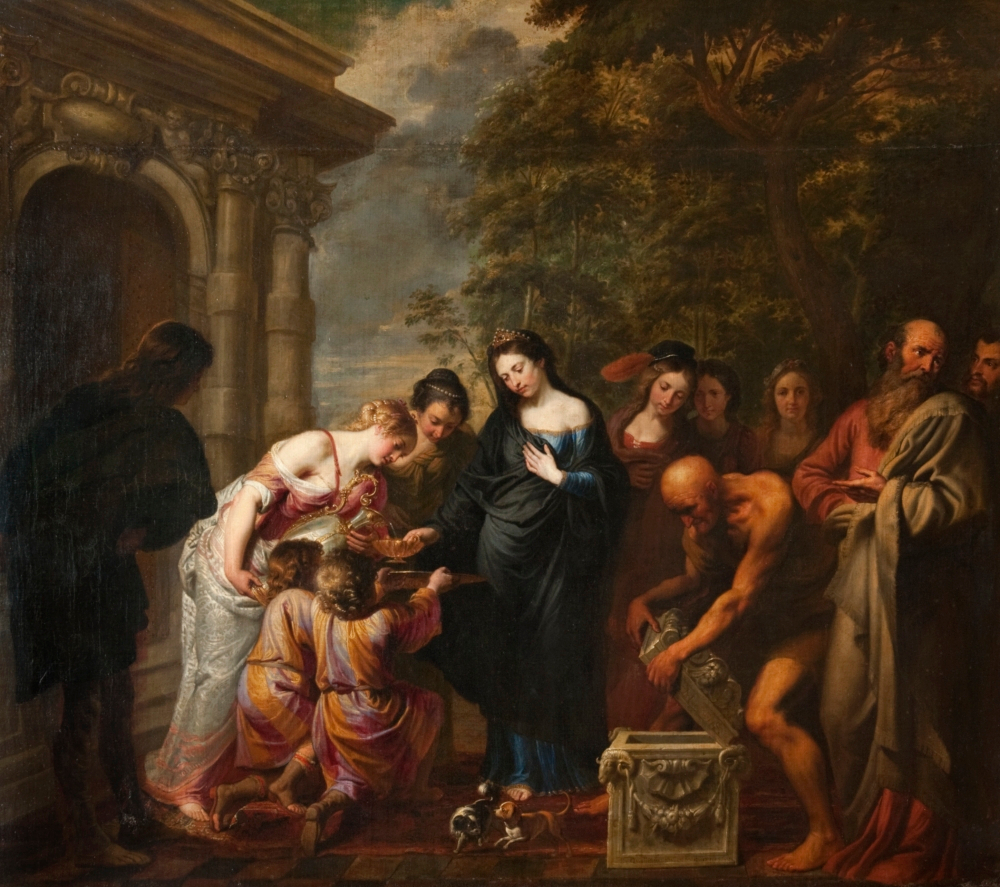
Erasmus Quellinus II, 1652 CE.

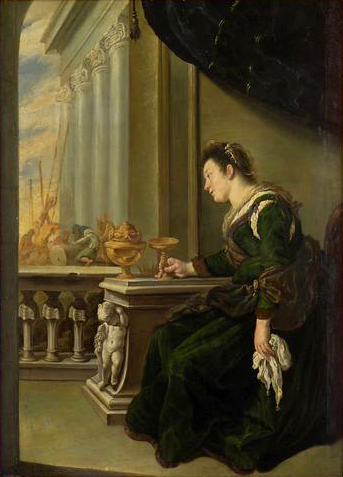
Domenico Fetti

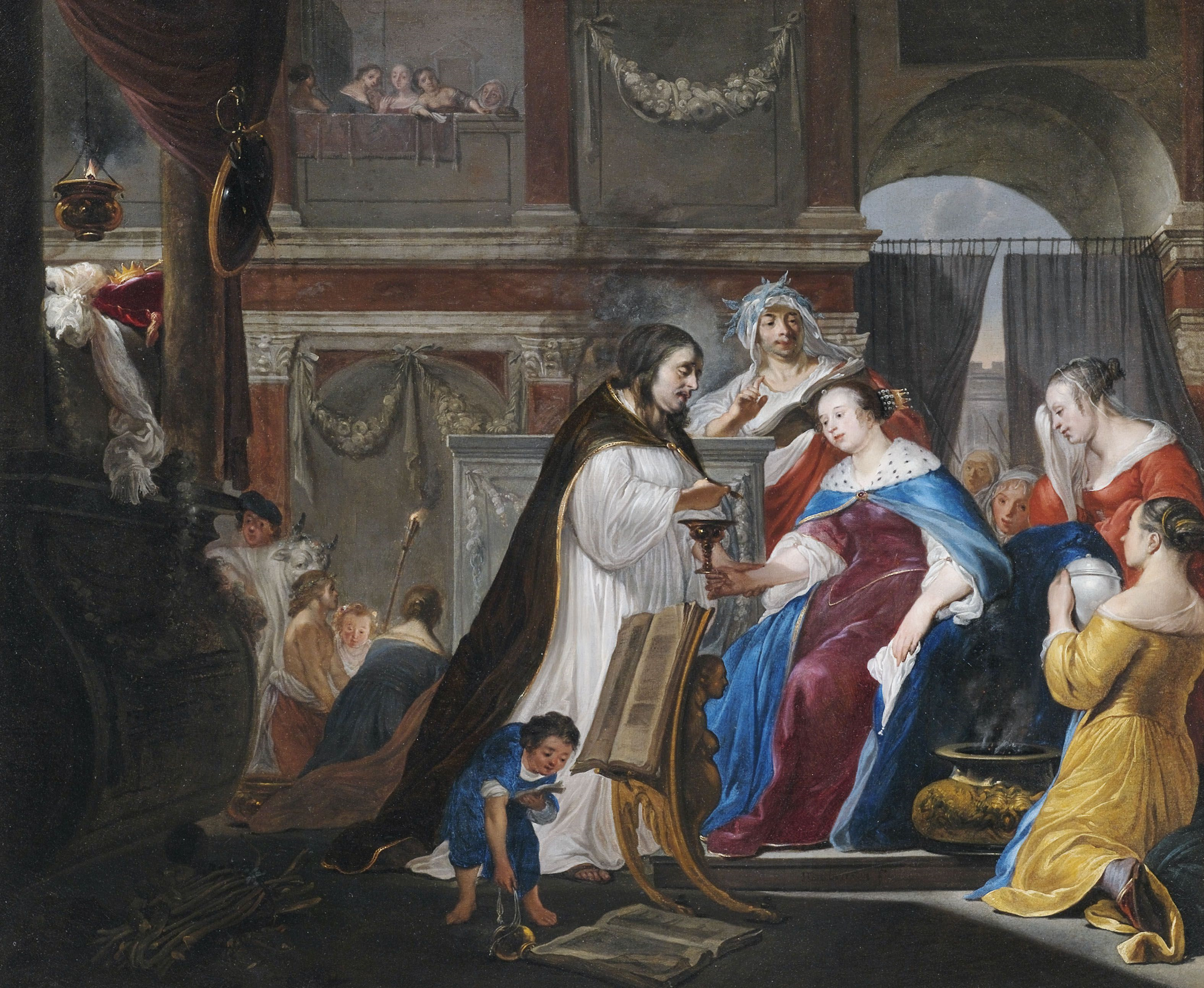
Arnold Houbraken, before 1719 CE.

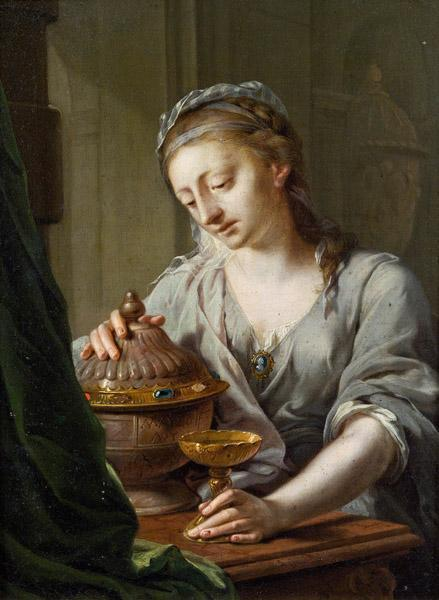
Johann Heinrich Tischbein, 1775 CE, Portrait of Countess Augusta Reuss of Ebersdorf, Queen Victoria's grandmother, as Artemesia.

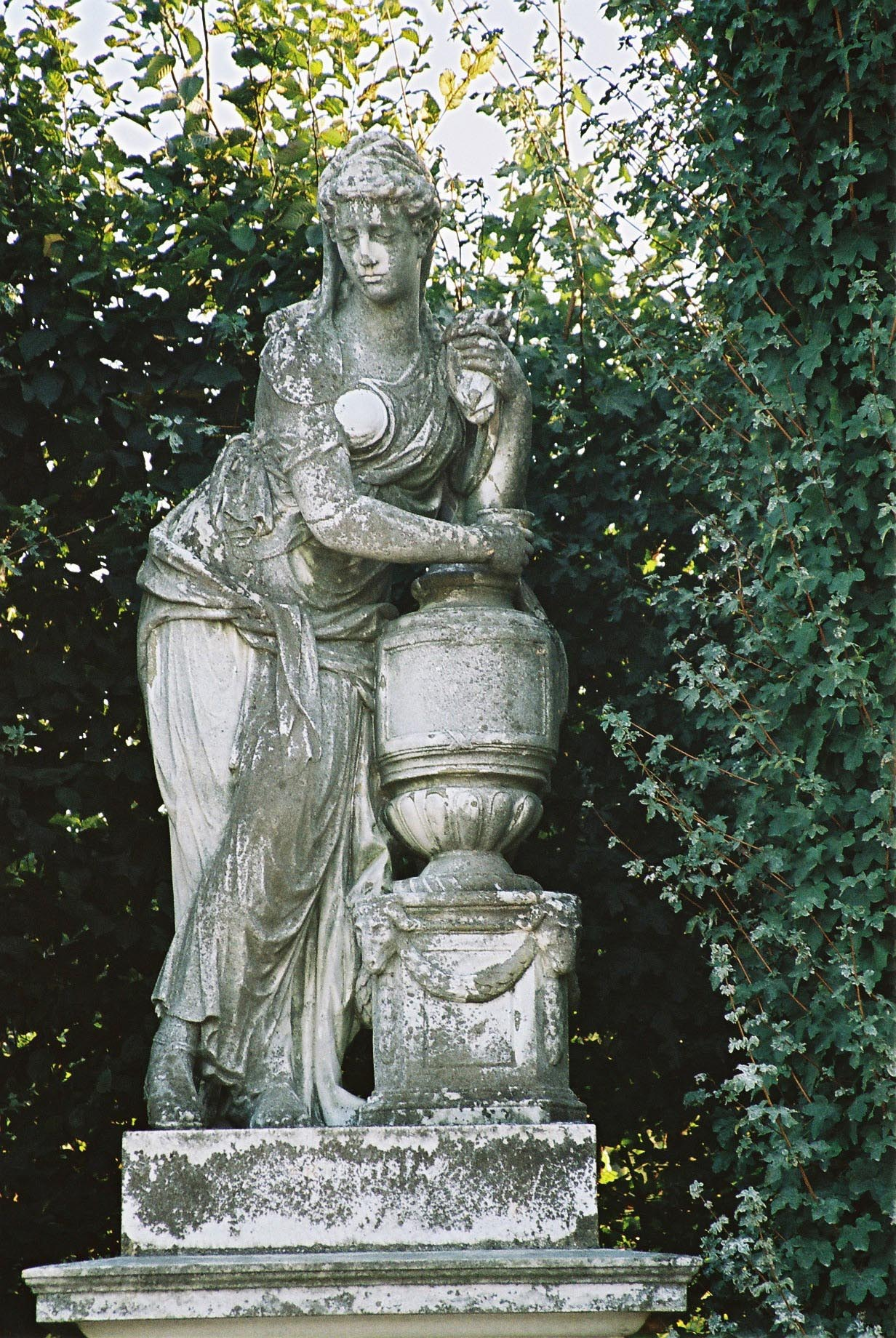
Schönbrunn Palace, Vienna, 1773–1780 CE.

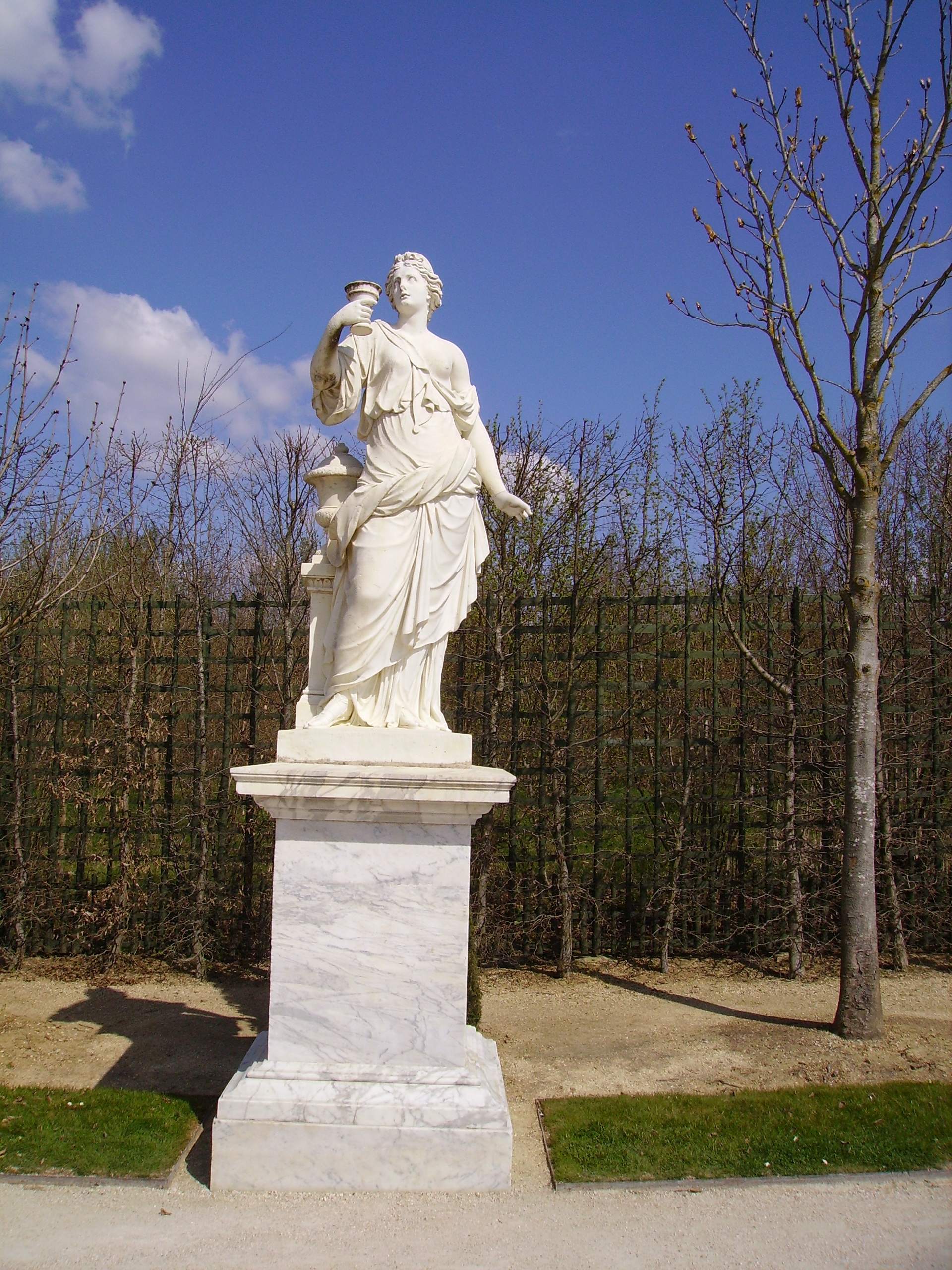
Statue of Artemisia II in Versailles.
