= Heracleides of Mylasa =

Heracleides of Mylasa (Ancient Greek: Ἡρακλείδης ὁ Μύλασος) was citizen of Mylasa in Caria, who commanded the Carian Greeks in their successful resistance to the arms of Persia after the revolt of Aristagoras in 498 BC. The Persian troops fell into an ambush which had been prepared for them, and were cut to pieces, together with their generals, Daurises, Amorges, and Sisimaces.
