= Alinda =

Ancient city in Caria

- Ἄλινδα (Ancient Greek)
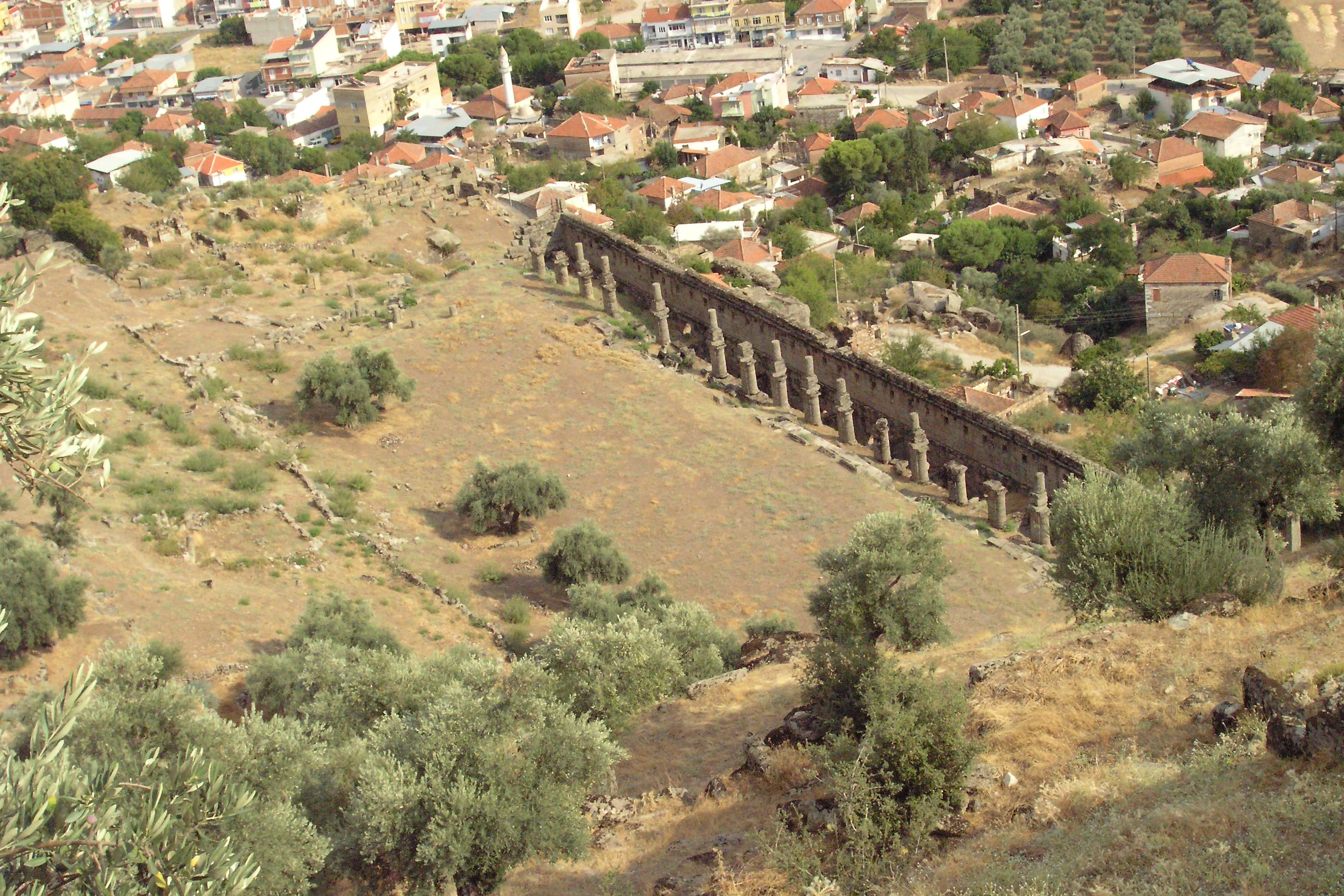
- Agora of Alinda

- Location within Turkey
- 37°33′29″N 27°49′47″E
- Type: Settlement
- Location: Near Karpuzlu, Aydın Province, Turkey
- Region: Caria

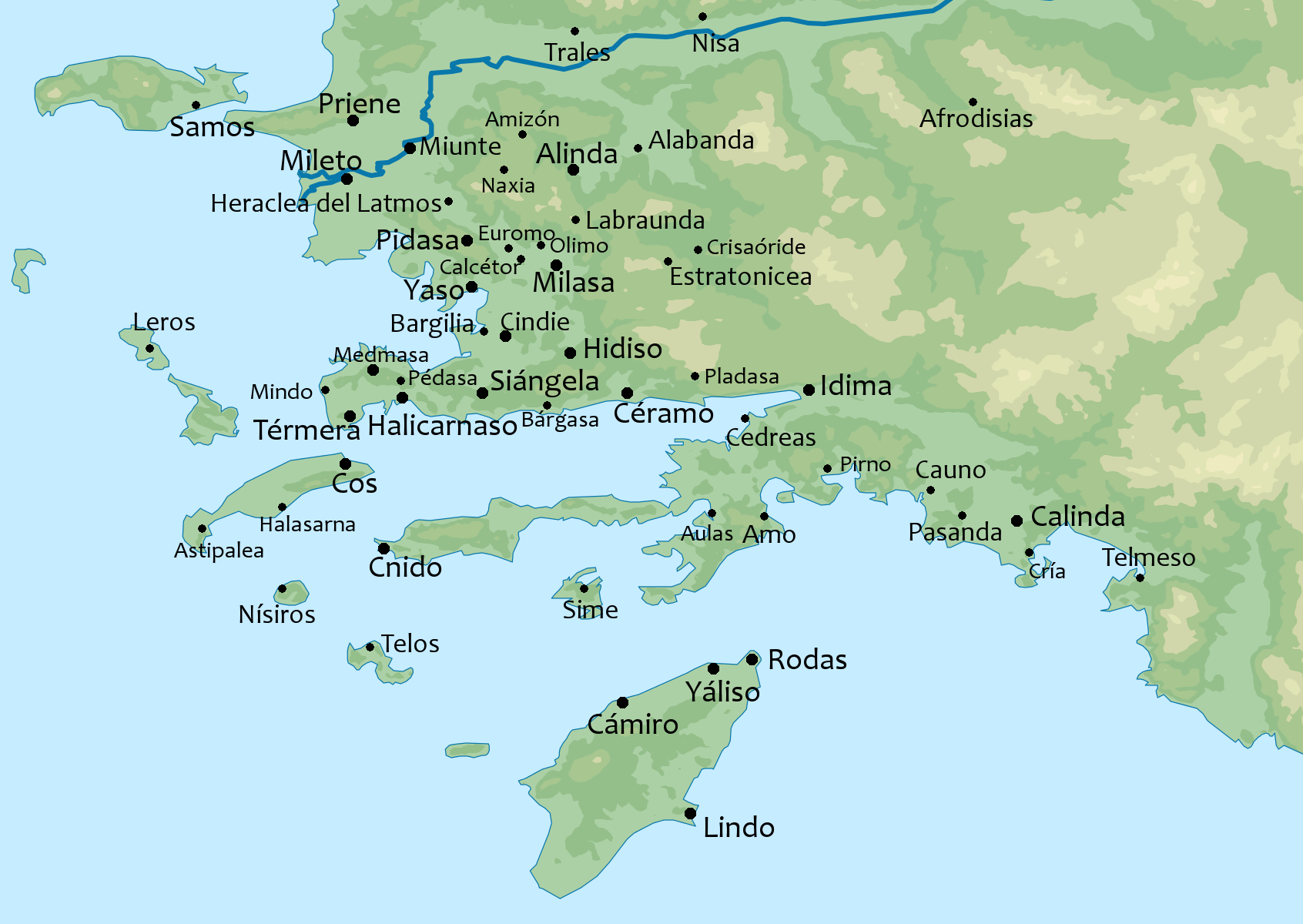
Ancient cities of Caria

Alinda (Ancient Greek: Ἄλινδα) was an inland city and bishopric in ancient Caria, in Asia Minor (Anatolia). Modern scholars identify Alinda with the Hellenistic foundation of Alexandria ad Latmum (Ἀλεξάνδρεια πρὸς τῷ Λάτμῳ) noted by Stephanus of Byzantium.

== Location and remains ==
It is situated near Demircideresi, on a hilltop which commands the modern-day town of Karpuzlu, Aydın Province, in western Turkey, and overlooks a fertile plain.

The non-restored but very well preserved ruins are much visited, especially within the circuit of organized tours (locally called "safaris") with departure from either the international tourism center of Bodrum or from Milas and reaching Karpuzlu through a mountain road from the south.

In 2018, four kilometers of the ancient stone road, which connects the ancient cities of Alinda and Latmus, were destroyed by villagers to make way for their olive groves.

== History ==
=== Late Bronze Age ===
Alinda has perhaps been an important city since the second millennium BC and has been associated with Ialanti (Iyalanti/Iyalanda) that appear in Hittite sources (J. Garstang, p. 179).

=== Classical Age ===
It was a member of the Delian League.

It was this fortress which was held by the exiled Carian Queen Ada. She greeted Alexander the Great here in 334 BC. When Alexander captured Caria, he granted Ada to be the ruler of the whole region.

The city was apparently renamed "Alexandria by the Latmos" (Greek: Αλεξάνδρεια στη Λάτμο) shortly afterwards, and was recorded as thus by Stephanus of Byzantium, although sources disagree as to the exact location of the settlement of that name. The prior name of Alinda was restored by 81 BC at the latest. It appears as "Alinda" in Ptolemy's Geographia (Book V, ch. 2) of the 2nd century AD.

Alinda remained an important commercial city, minting its own coins from the third century BC to the 3rd century AD. Stephanus records that the city had a temple of Apollo containing a statue of Aphrodite by Praxiteles.

Alinda has a necropolis of Carian tombs and has been partially excavated. Alinda also had a major water system including a Roman aqueduct, a nearly-intact market place, a 5,000-seat Roman theater in relatively good condition, and remains of numerous temples and sarcophagi.

== Ecclesiastical history ==
Alinda appears on Byzantine lists of bishoprics. It was a suffragan of the Metropolitan of Stauropolis, the capital of the Roman province of Caria, but was to fade.

=== Residential Bishops ===
(incomplete)

- Promachios fl.451
- John fl.451
- Theodoretus fl.536

=== Titular Bishopric ===
It was nominally restored as a Latin titular see of the Roman Catholic Church but has been vacant since the death of the last bishop in 1976, having had the following incumbents, all of the lowest (episcopal) rank :

- Alexandre-Louis-Victor-Aimé Le Roy, Holy Ghost Fathers (C.S.Sp.) (1892.07.03 – 1921.05.13), as Apostolic Vicar of Gabon (Gabon) (1892.07.03 – 1896.05.24), later Superior General of the Congregation of the Holy Spirit (Spiritans, Holy Ghost Fathers) (1896.07 – 1926), Titular Archbishop of Caria (see) (1921.05.13 – 1938.04.21)
- Edward Komar (1921.06.16 – 1943.09.29)
- Juan Hervás y Benet (1944.01.13 – 1947.12.22)
- Eris Norman Michael O’Brien (1948.02.05 – 1951.01.11) as Auxiliary Bishop of Sydney (Australia) (1948.02.05 – 1951.01.11); later Titular Archbishop of Cyrrhus (1951.01.11 – 1953.11.16), Coadjutor Archbishop of Canberra and Goulburn (Australia) (1951.01.11 – 1953.11.16), succeeding as Archbishop of Canberra and Goulburn (1953.11.16 – 1966.11.20), emeritate as Titular Archbishop of Apamea in Syria (1966.11.20 – 1974.02.28)* Gabriel Manek, Divine Word Missionaries (S.V.D.) (1951.03.08 – 1961.01.03) as Apostolic Vicar of Larantuka (Indonesia) (1951.03.08 – 1961.01.03), later Metropolitan Archbishop of Endeh (Indonesia) (1961.01.03 – 1968.12.19), emeritate as Titular Archbishop of Bavagaliana (1968.12.19 – 1976.05.15)
- Charles Alexander Grant (1961.02.06 – 1967.03.14)
- Robert Lebel (1974.03.11 – 1976.03.26)
- Juan Hervás y Benet (1976.09.30 – 1982.06.06)

== See also ==
- List of cities founded by Alexander the Great

== Sources and external links ==
- The Princeton Encyclopedia of Classical Sites. "Perseus Digital Library: Alinda". Princeton University.
- George E. Bean (1971). Turkey beyond the Maeander. Frederick A. Praeger, London. ISBN 0-87471-038-3.
- J. Garstang, The Hittite Empire (University Press, Edinburgh, 1930), p. 179.
- GigaCatholic with titular incumbent biography links
- Tens of pictures but without the agora or theatre
