= Orontobates =

Persian Satrap of Caria

Orontobates (Old Persian: *Arvantapātah, Ancient Greek: Ὀροντοβάτης Orontobátēs; lived 4th century BC) was a Persian, who married the daughter of Pixodarus, the usurping satrap of Caria, and was sent by the king of Persia to succeed him.

== Biography ==
On the approach of Alexander the Great of Macedon, (334 BC) Orontobates and Memnon of Rhodes entrenched themselves in Halicarnassus (modern Bodrum). But at last, despairing of defending it, they set fire to the town, and under cover of the conflagration crossed over to Cos, whither they had previously removed their treasures. In addition to the island of Cos, Orontobates, retained control of the citadel at Salmacis, and the towns Myndus, Caunus, Thera and Callipolis together with Triopium.

Next year, while at Soli, Cilicia, Alexander learnt that Orontobates had been defeated in a great battle by Ptolemy and Asander. It is natural to infer that the places which Orontobates held did not long hold out after his defeat.

An officer of the name of Orontobates was present in the army of Darius III at the battle of Gaugamela (331 BC), being one of the commanders of the troops drawn from the shores of the Persian Gulf. Whether he was the same or a different person from the preceding, we have no means of knowing. We are not told that the latter was killed as well as defeated.

It is likely that Alexander the Great knew Orontobates intimately as there was a princess between the two. In his youth Alexander wanted to marry Ada II, the daughter of Pixodarus but this was negated by his father. Incidentally Orontobates married a daughter of Pixodarus, who was also called Ada and probably the same as Ada II. Thus, the relation between the two may have been far more complex than what Justin or even Plutarch knew.

== Sources ==
- Smith, William (editor); Dictionary of Greek and Roman Biography and Mythology, "Orontobates (1)", Boston, (1867)
