= Lycian (Unicode block) =

- Range: U+10280..U+1029F (32 code points)
- Plane: SMP
- Scripts: Lycian
- Major alphabets: Lycian
- Assigned: 29 code points
- Unused: 3 reserved code points

Unicode version history
- 5.1 (2008): 29 (+29)

Unicode documentation
- Code chart ∣ Web page

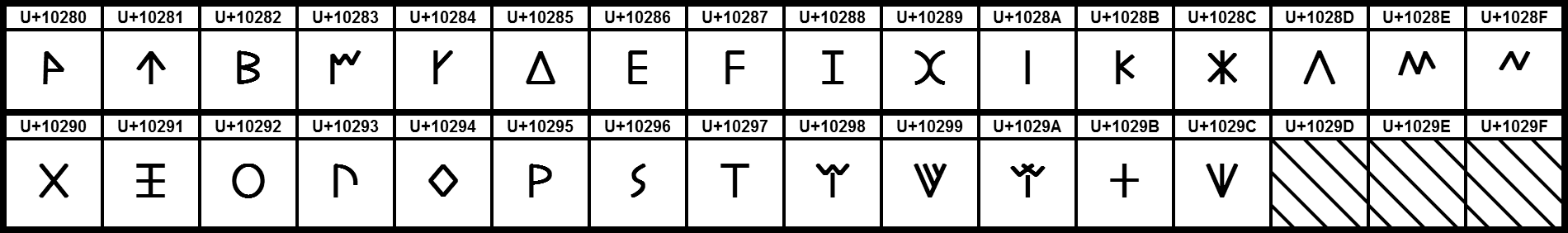
Graphical representation of the Lycian Unicode block

Lycian is a Unicode block containing characters for writing the ancient Lycian language in Anatolia.

Lycian^{[1]}^{[2]} Official Unicode Consortium code chart (PDF)
	0	1	2	3	4	5	6	7	8	9	A	B	C	D	E	F
U+1028x	𐊀	𐊁	𐊂	𐊃	𐊄	𐊅	𐊆	𐊇	𐊈	𐊉	𐊊	𐊋	𐊌	𐊍	𐊎	𐊏
U+1029x	𐊐	𐊑	𐊒	𐊓	𐊔	𐊕	𐊖	𐊗	𐊘	𐊙	𐊚	𐊛	𐊜			
Notes: 1. As of Unicode version 16.0; 2. Grey areas indicate non-assigned code points

== History ==
The following Unicode-related documents record the purpose and process of defining specific characters in the Lycian block:

Version	Final code points (Note: Proposed code points and characters names may differ from final code points and names)	Count	L2 ID	WG2 ID	Document
5.1	U+10280..1029C	29	L2/00-128		Bunz, Carl-Martin (2000-03-01), Scripts from the Past in Future Versions of Unicode
5.1	U+10280..1029C	29	L2/00-153		Bunz, Carl-Martin (2000-04-26), Further comments on historic scripts
5.1	U+10280..1029C	29	L2/05-101	N2939	Everson, Michael (2005-04-27), Proposal for encoding the Lycian script in the UCS
5.1	U+10280..1029C	29	L2/05-241		Everson, Michael (2005-08-31), Old Anatolian scripts
5.1	U+10280..1029C	29	L2/05-380	N3109R	Everson, Michael (2006-01-12), Proposal to encode the Lycian and Lydian scripts
5.1	U+10280..1029C	29	L2/06-050	N3019R2	Everson, Michael (2006-02-05), Proposal to encode the Lycian and Lydian scripts in the SMP of the UCS
5.1	U+10280..1029C	29	L2/06-008R2		Moore, Lisa (2006-02-13), "C.1", UTC #106 Minutes
5.1	U+10280..1029C	29		N2953 (pdf, doc)	Umamaheswaran, V. S. (2006-02-16), "7.4.2", Unconfirmed minutes of WG 2 meeting 47, Sophia Antipolis, France; 2005-09-12/15
5.1	U+10280..1029C	29		N3103 (pdf, doc)	Umamaheswaran, V. S. (2006-08-25), "M48.6", Unconfirmed minutes of WG 2 meeting 48, Mountain View, CA, USA; 2006-04-24/27
