= Ada (daughter of Pixodarus) =

Noblewoman of the Persian satrapy of Caria

Ada was a noblewoman of the Persian satrapy of Caria who lived in the second half of the 4th century BC. In 336 BC Alexander the Great intended to marry her, but this plan failed.

== Life ==
Ada was the eldest daughter of Pixodarus, who had been satrap of Caria since about 340 BC, and Aphneïs, a woman from Cappadocia. In the spring of 336 BC, Pixodarus endeavoured to forge closer ties with King Philip II of Macedon through a marriage alliance and sent Aristocritus as his envoy to the Macedonian court. Such a union was favourable to Philip's political ambitions against the Persian king Darius III; and Pixodarus could hope to gain greater independence from Darius III. The Macedonian king therefore proposed his mentally disabled son Arrhidaius, who had previously been excluded from the succession to the throne and was an elder stepbrother of Alexander the Great, as bridegroom for Pixodarus' daughter Ada. Alexander had only recently returned to the Macedonian royal court in Pella after a quarrel with his father Philip II, but he continued to worry about his right of succession to the throne, which was now in question. When he learned of Philip's marriage project, he tried to thwart it by asking for Ada's hand himself in order to prevent the legitimisation of his stepbrother. In the end, neither of them materialised due to the contradictory nature of the two marriage plans.

Shortly afterwards, Pixodarus returned to a pro-Persian policy and gave his daughter Ada in marriage to the Persian nobleman Orontobates. After Pixodarus' death (335 BC), Ada may have briefly ruled over Caria with her husband. The following year, Alexander launched his Asian campaign, during which he reinstated Ada's aunt of the same name as Carian regent in the summer of 334 BC. There is no record of Ada's subsequent fate.

== Sources ==
- Helmut Berve|: Ada 2), in: Realencyclopädie der classischen Altertumswissenschaft, supplementary volume 4, Stuttgart 1924, col. 7.
- Waldemar Heckel: Who’s Who in the Age of Alexander the Great. Prosopography of Alexander’s Empire. Blackwell, Oxford, 2006, ISBN 1-4051-1210-7, p. 4.
- Siegfried Lauffer: Alexander der Große. Third edition. Deutscher Taschenbuch-Verlag, Munich 1993, ISBN 3-423-04298-2, p. 36.
