= Cadyanda =

Ancient Lycian town

Cadianda
- Καδυάνα (Greek)
- (also Cadyanda, Kadawati, Kadawanti or Καδυάνα; Kadyánda; Ancient Greek: Κάλυνδα)
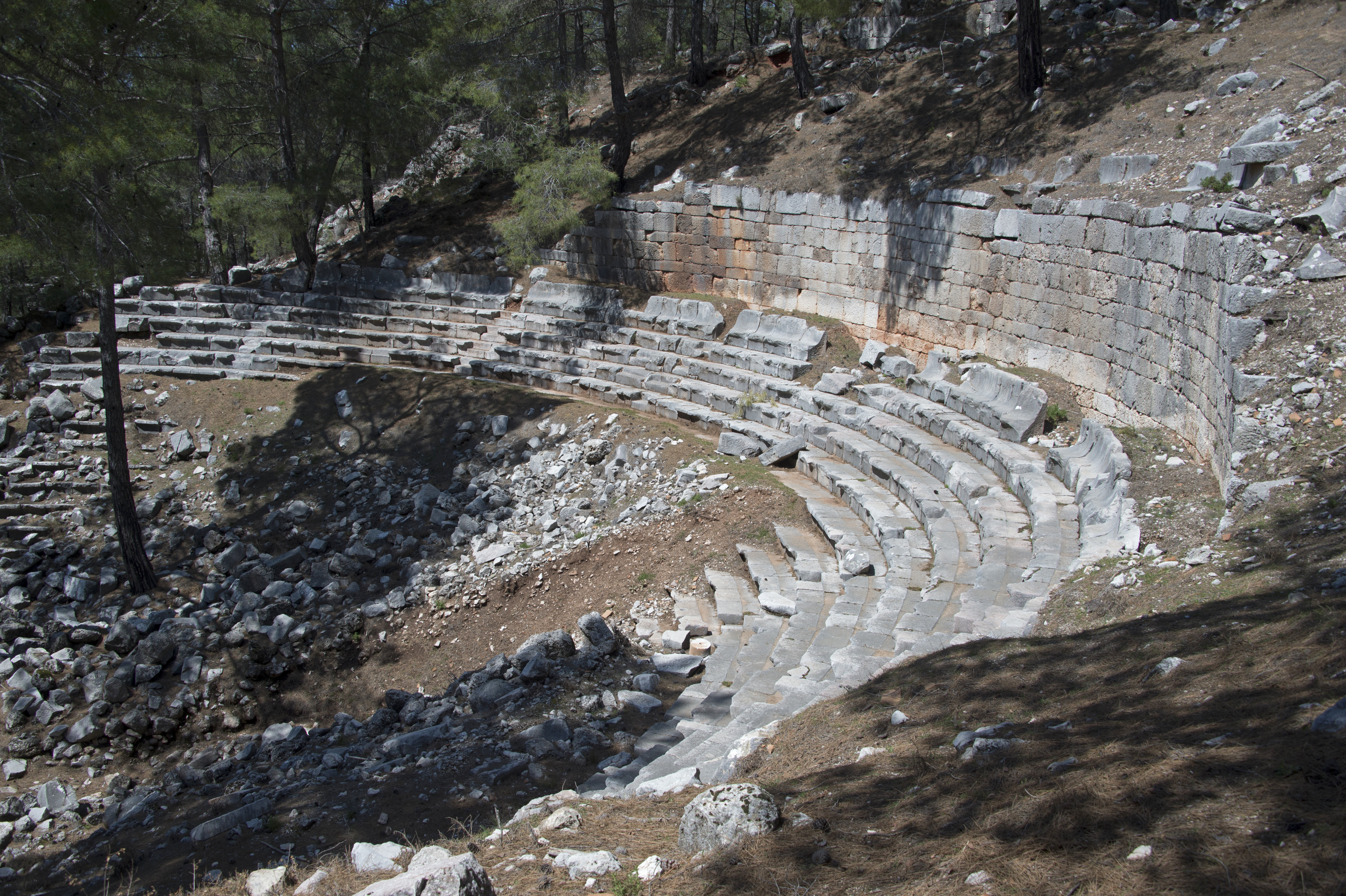
- Cadianda theatre

- Location within Turkey
- 36°43′01″N 29°14′10″E
- Type: Settlement
- Location: Fethiye, Muğla Province, Turkey
- Region: Lycia

History
- Built: 3 thousand BC
- Abandoned: 7th century AD (last settlements)

Site notes
- Condition: Ruined
- Public access: Yes
- Website: Turkish text on museum-card site

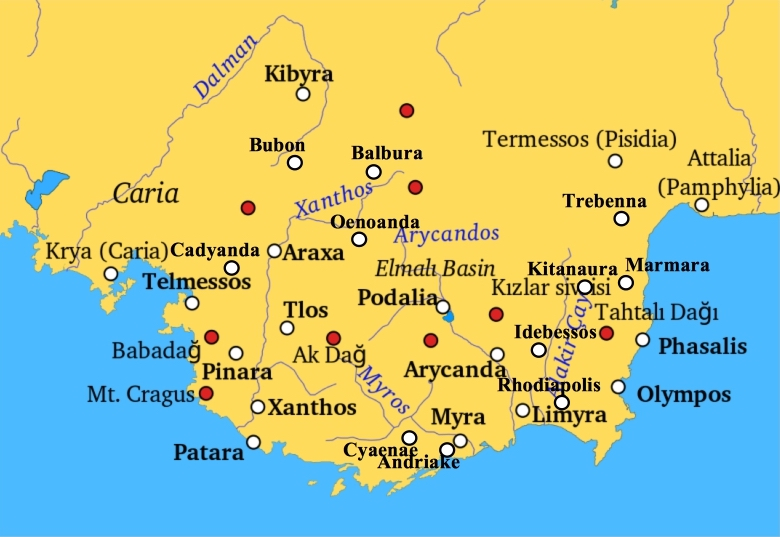
Cities of ancient Lycia

Cadyanda or Kadyanda (Ancient Greek: Καδύανδα) was a town of ancient Lycia. The site was discovered by Charles Fellows. The decree of Pixodarus now in the British Museum shows that the Lycian name of the town was Xadawãti (Lycian: 𐊜𐊀𐊅𐊀𐊇𐊙𐊗𐊆).

Its site is on a hill top, it can be reached from Üzümlü, Asiatic Turkey. at the foot of that hill, that has a bus connection to Fethiye, some 25 kilometers away.

== The Site ==
Cadianda is not named by any ancient author (with the possible exception of Pliny). Nevertheless, it was not without importance.

Extensive remains today include a stadium, a theatre, baths, agora and several temples. On one side of the agora stood a Dorian temple, on its walls a long list of contributors was legible.

A notice on the site as well as various other sources stress that the remains one can now see date from the 5th century BC and after. Its text is as follows: “The ancient city of Cadianda is located [at] about 24 km. distance from Fethiye. To reach Cadianda follow the village road between Yeşil Üzümlü town and Ortaköy village, and then turn south to the 8 km. long stabilized forest road at Ecebeli locality. Cadianda’s name was read as “Kadawanti” in the Lycian inscriptions. Because of the suffix “-nd”, it can be said that the history of [the] settlement dates back to 3 thousand BC. However, the oldest remains of the ancient city that have survived on the surface do not go [back] more than [to] the 5th century BC. Part of the ruins of city walls surrounding Cadianda, tombs and some of the inscriptions are the only remains dated to the earliest period. The city is surrounded by walls which were rebuilt many times due to the topography and the steep slopes of the land. Mostly [the] south parts of the wall still remain. Polygonal city walls from the Hellenistic Period formed retaining walls of the ancient theatre and show a high quality workmanship. The Hellenistic Theatre was repaired and used again in the Roman Period and can be reached by the side of the Cadianda city walls. Leaning on the southern slopes of the acropolis, despite the collapse, the theatre reflects its former glory. [The] necropolis area is located in the southern part of the city outside the fortress walls. Other significant structures are cistern ruins. Four major inter-connecting cisterns which are located under a wide field at the eastern part of the stadium, shows us the significance of the water shortage problem in the ancient city. Most of the remaining ruins in Cadianda belonged to the Roman Period. Even though there have been settlements until the 7th century AD, remains of the late period are not intense, apart from those you can see. Baths, running track, the Agora, ruins of a temple belonged to an unknown God and traces of intense civil construction reveal the identity of a full city and ancient settlement of Cadianda."

The necropolis has been plundered and partly destroyed, and much of the area was overgrown during a 2016 visit, though some paths allow for a walk along most sights. The tombs close to the city have a vaulted form, rarely seen in Lycia as a whole.

On Brill’s site the following was legible, “(Καδυάνα; Kadyánda). Mountain city in north-west Lycia south of today's Dereköy, above the inland plains of Üzümlü, comprising a large territory that borders on Bubon in the north and on Araxa in the east [1. 377–392; 2; 3]. The type of graves and the particular coin minting during the classical period both indicate the significance of the old Lycian settlement Χadawāti within the region ruled by Xanthus [4. 31–35; 5; 6. 31f.,...”

Along the road uphill to the town there are three tombs with inscriptions and/or reliefs. Two are near Üzümlü, one is on the slope of the mountain.

== Gallery ==
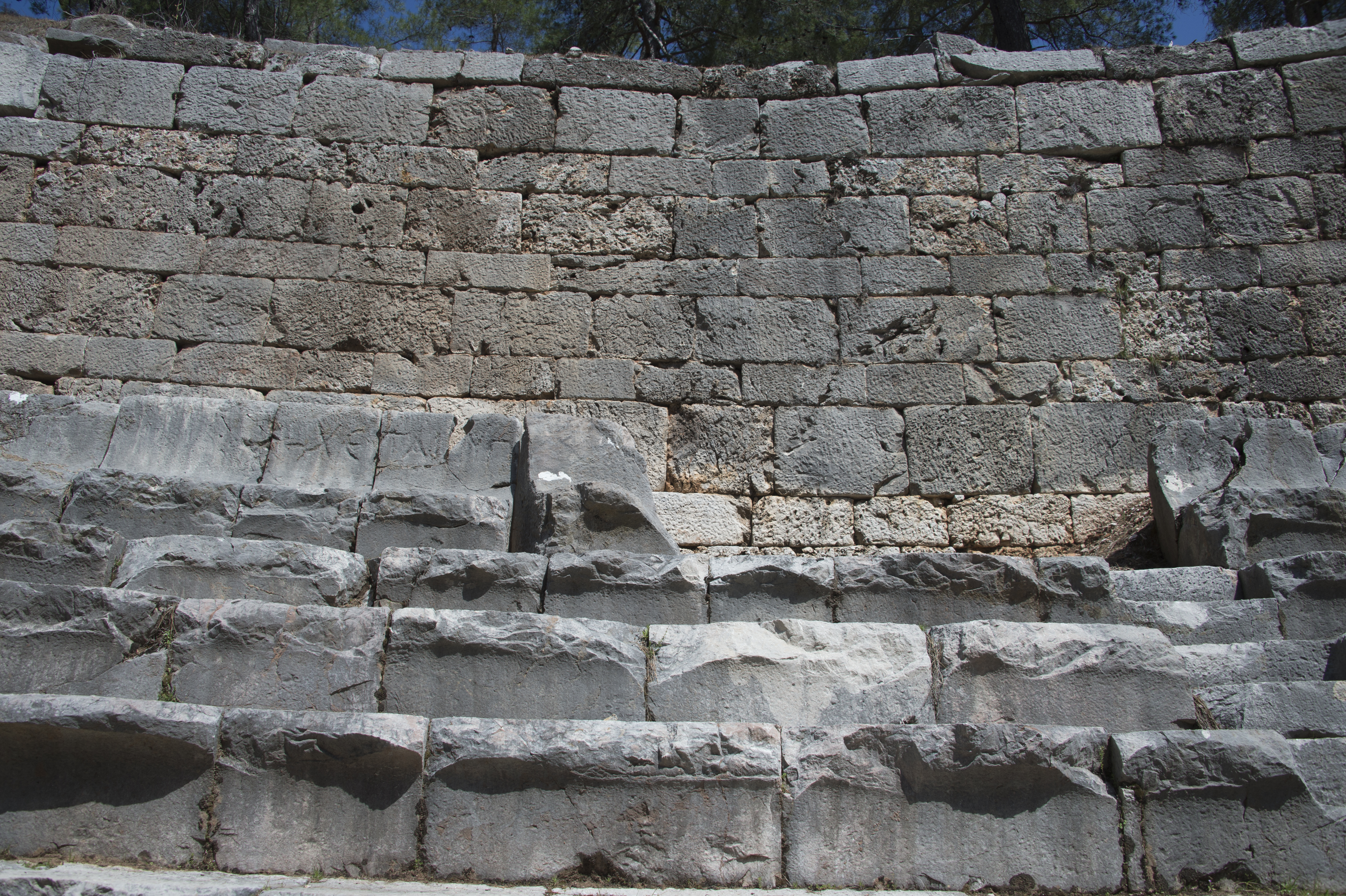
Cadianda Theatre

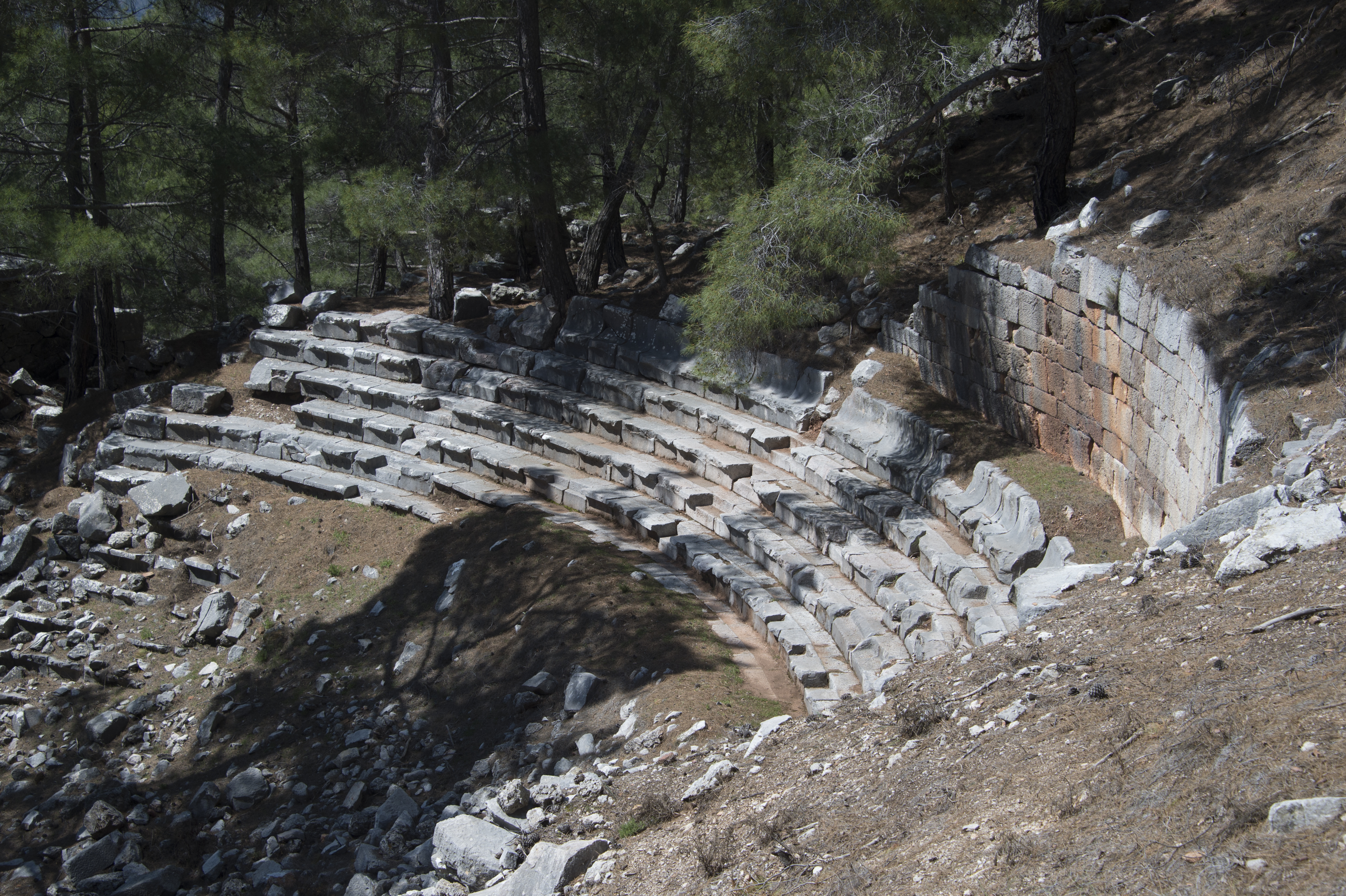
Cadianda Theatre

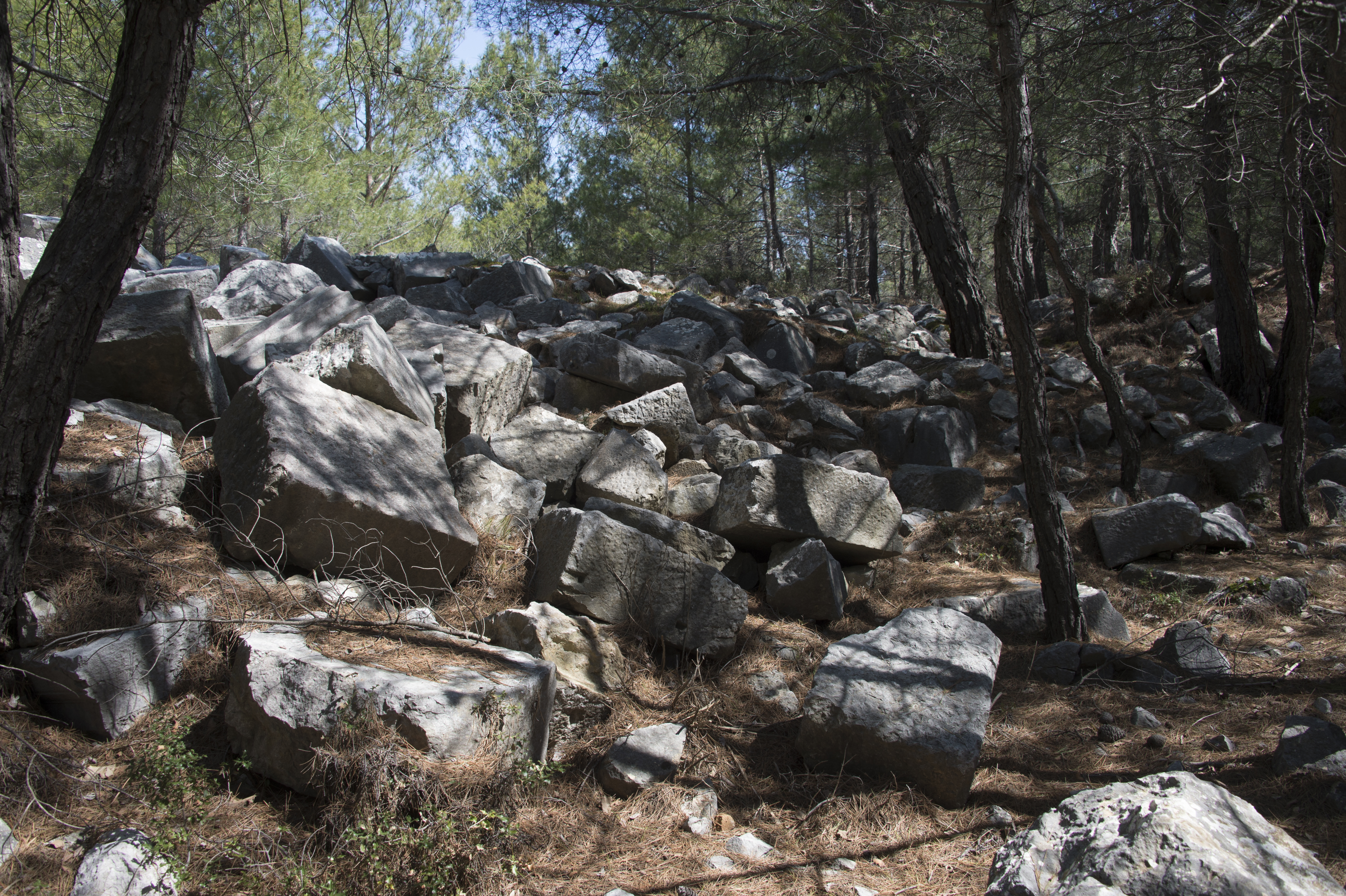
Cadianda Temple remains

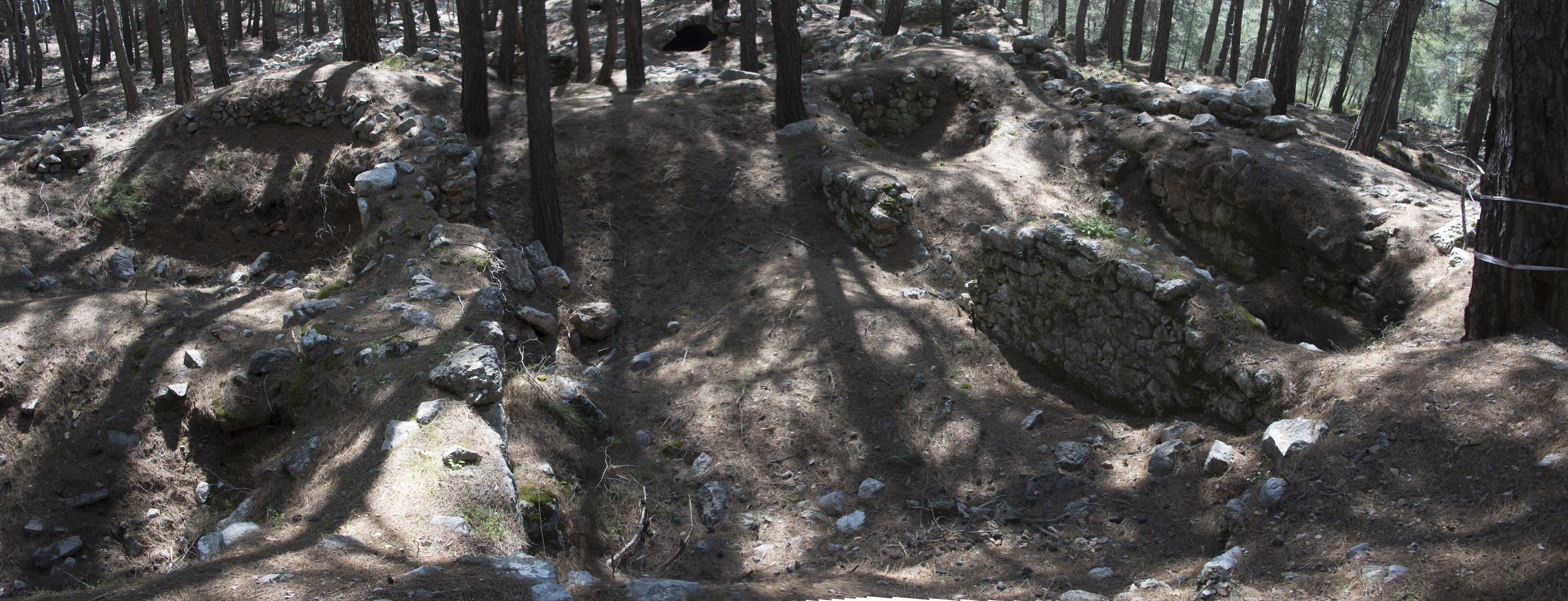
Cadianda Stoa - maybe - panorama

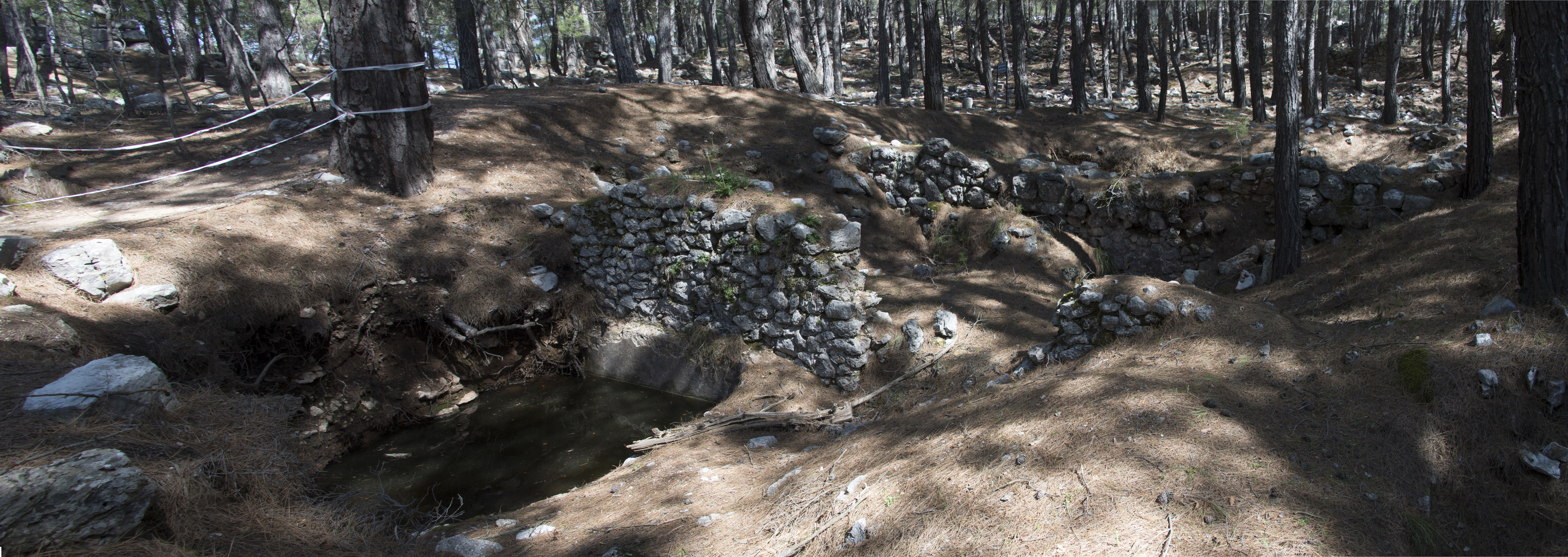
Cadianda Stoa - maybe - panorama

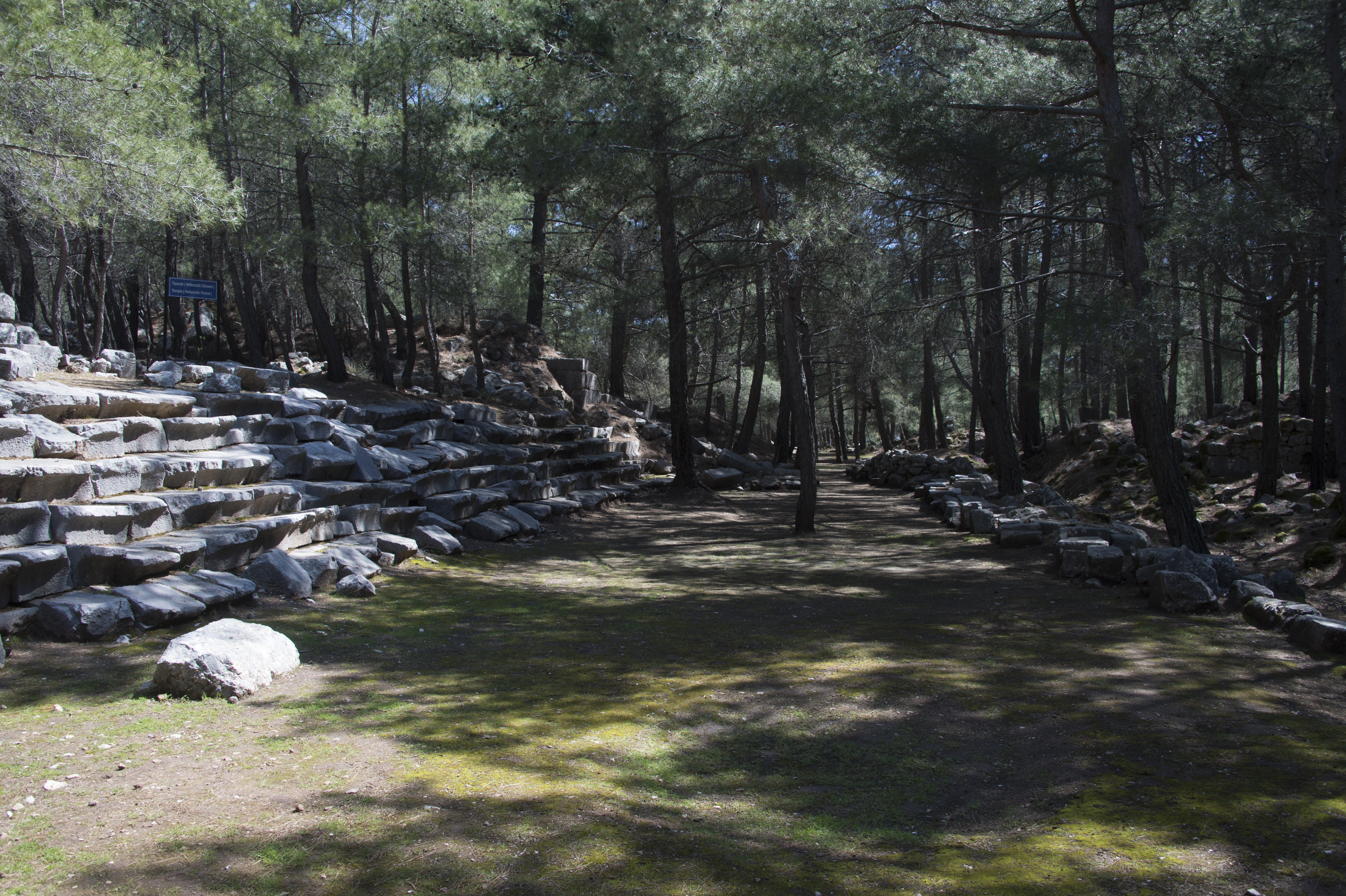
Kadyanda Stadion

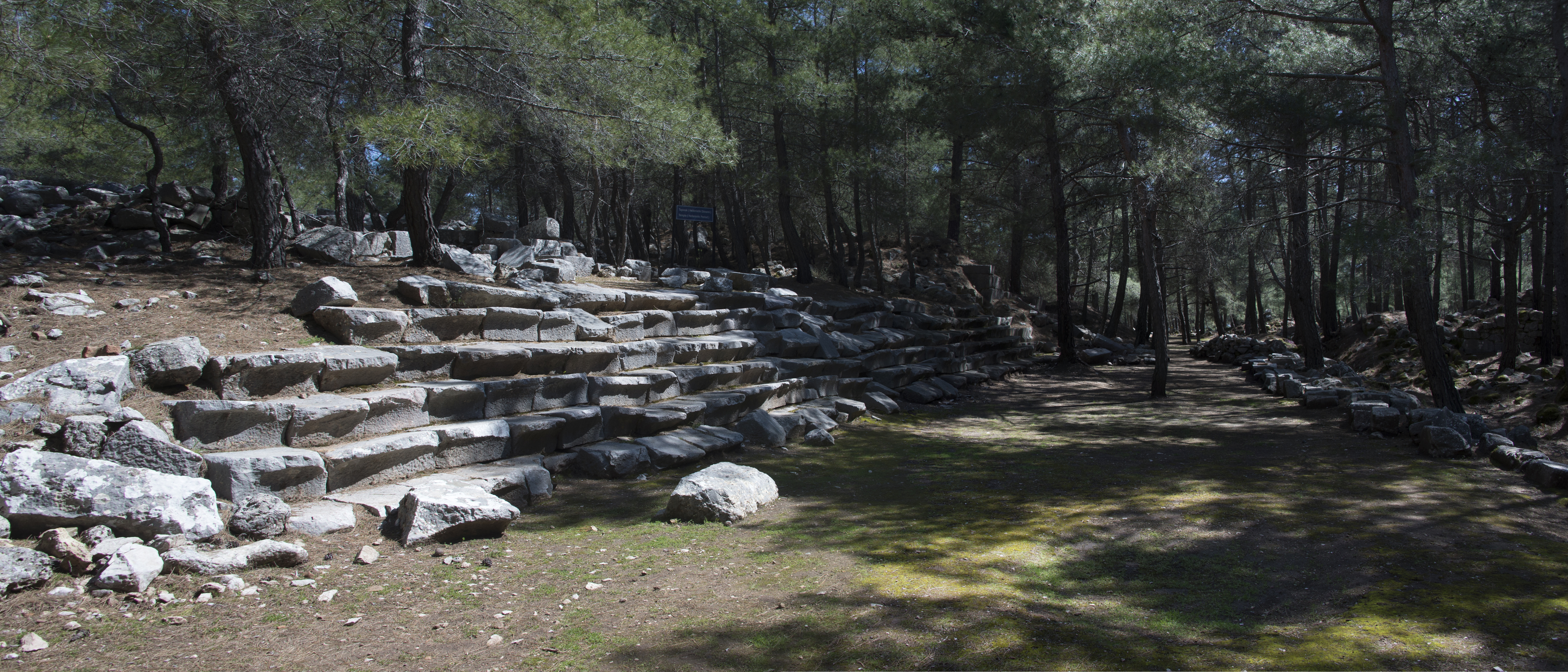
Kadyanda Stadion panorama

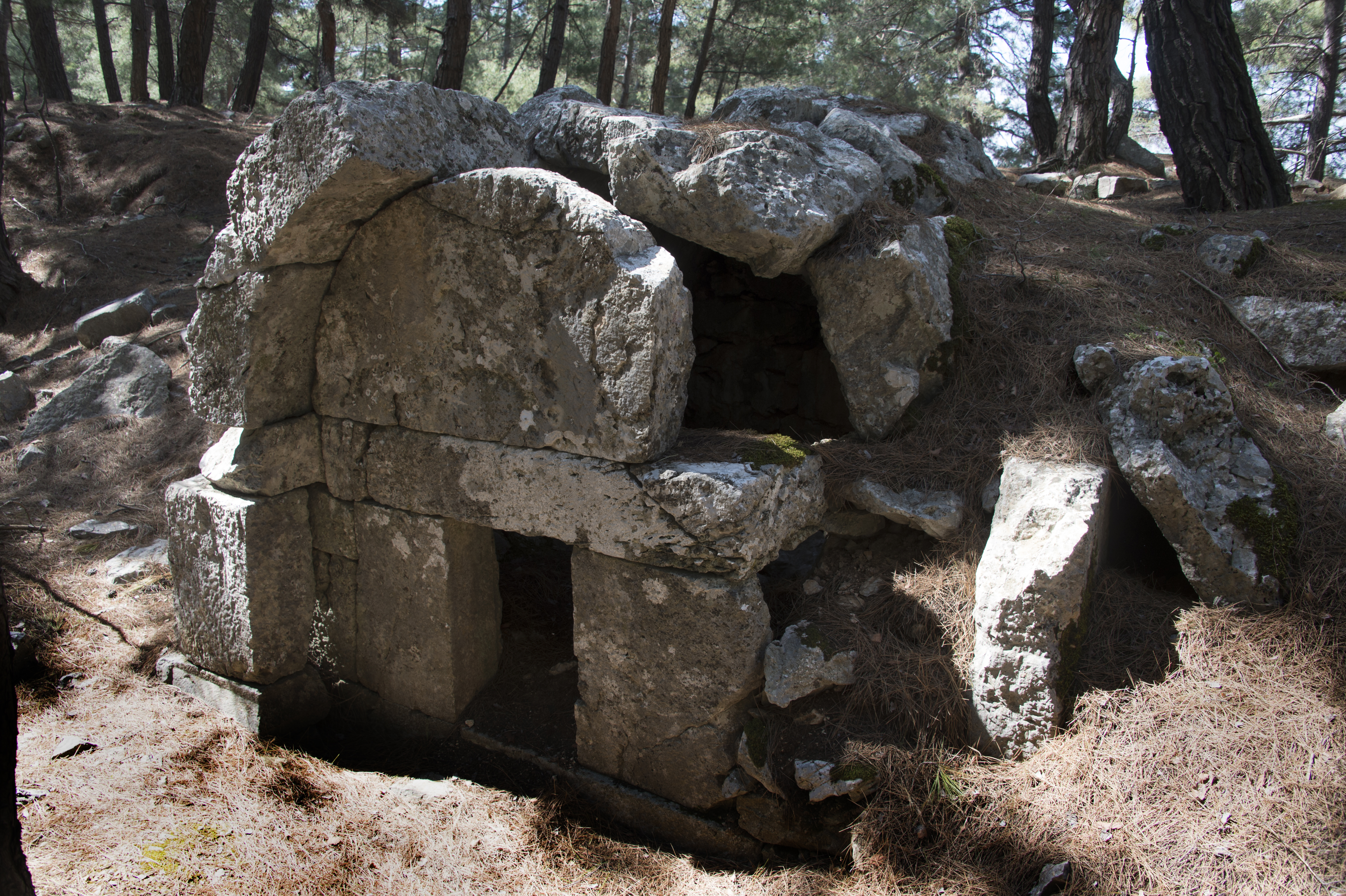
Cadianda Necropolis

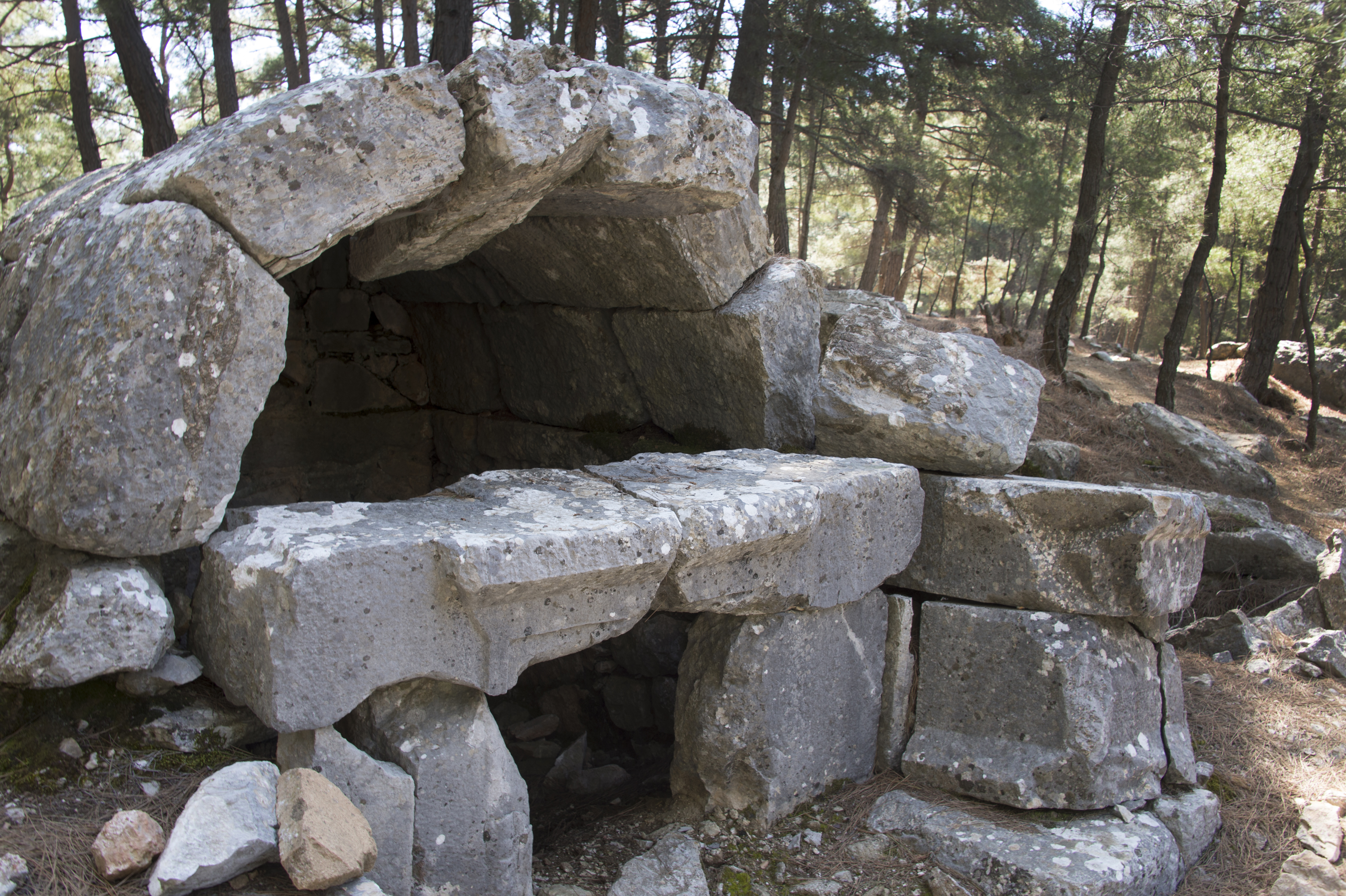
Cadianda Necropolis

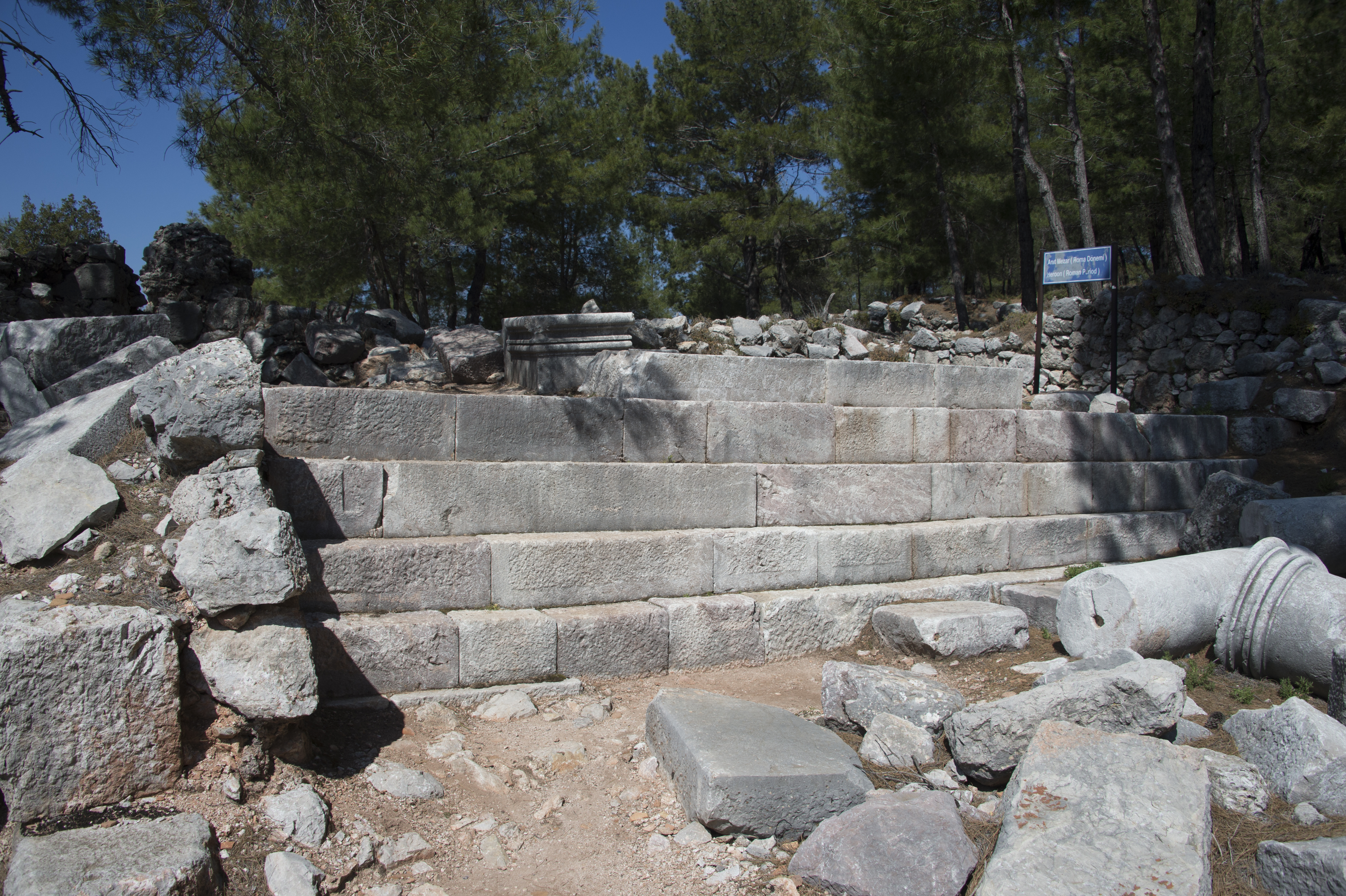
Cadianda Heroon

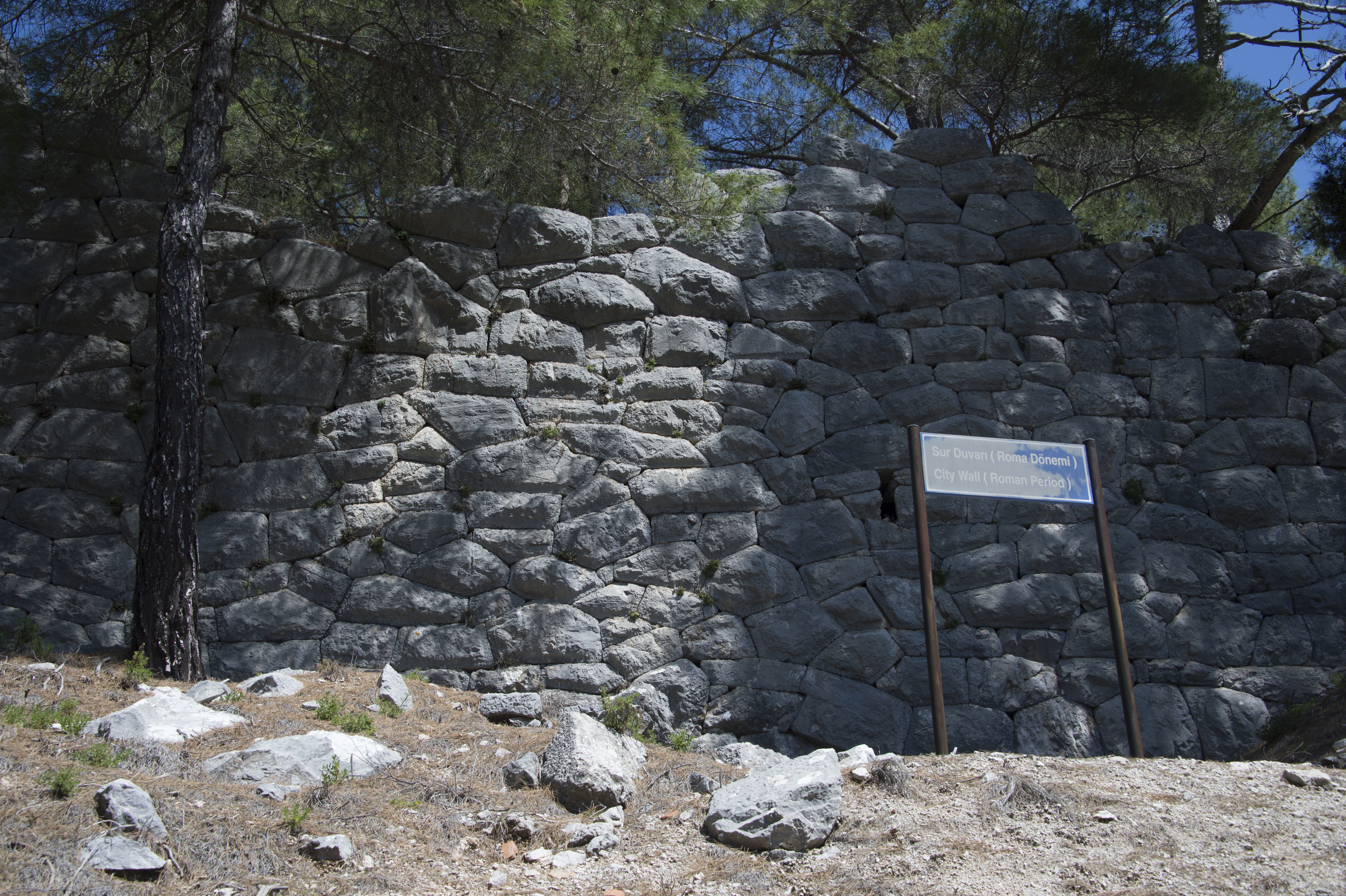
Cadianda City

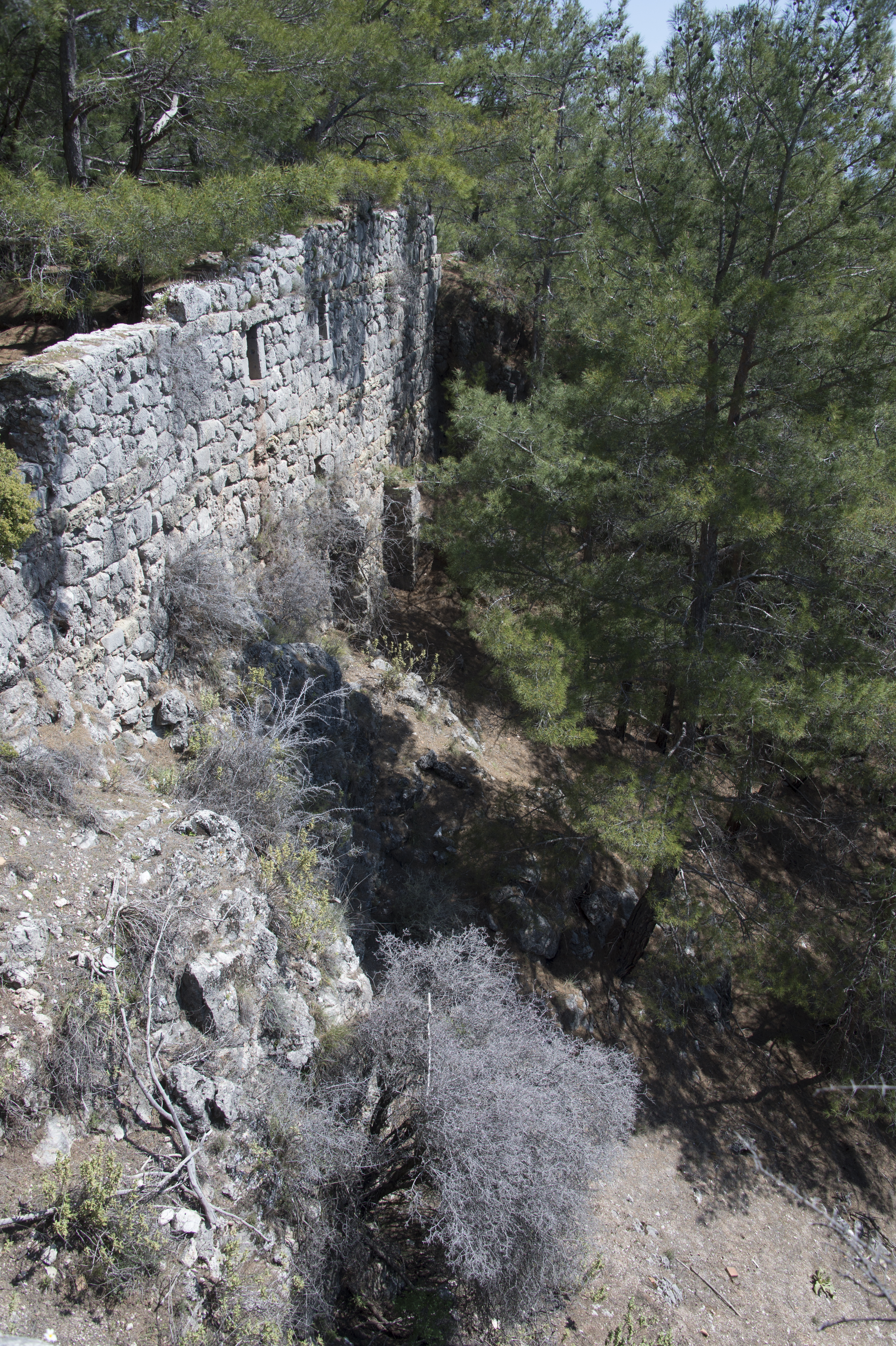
Cadianda City Wall

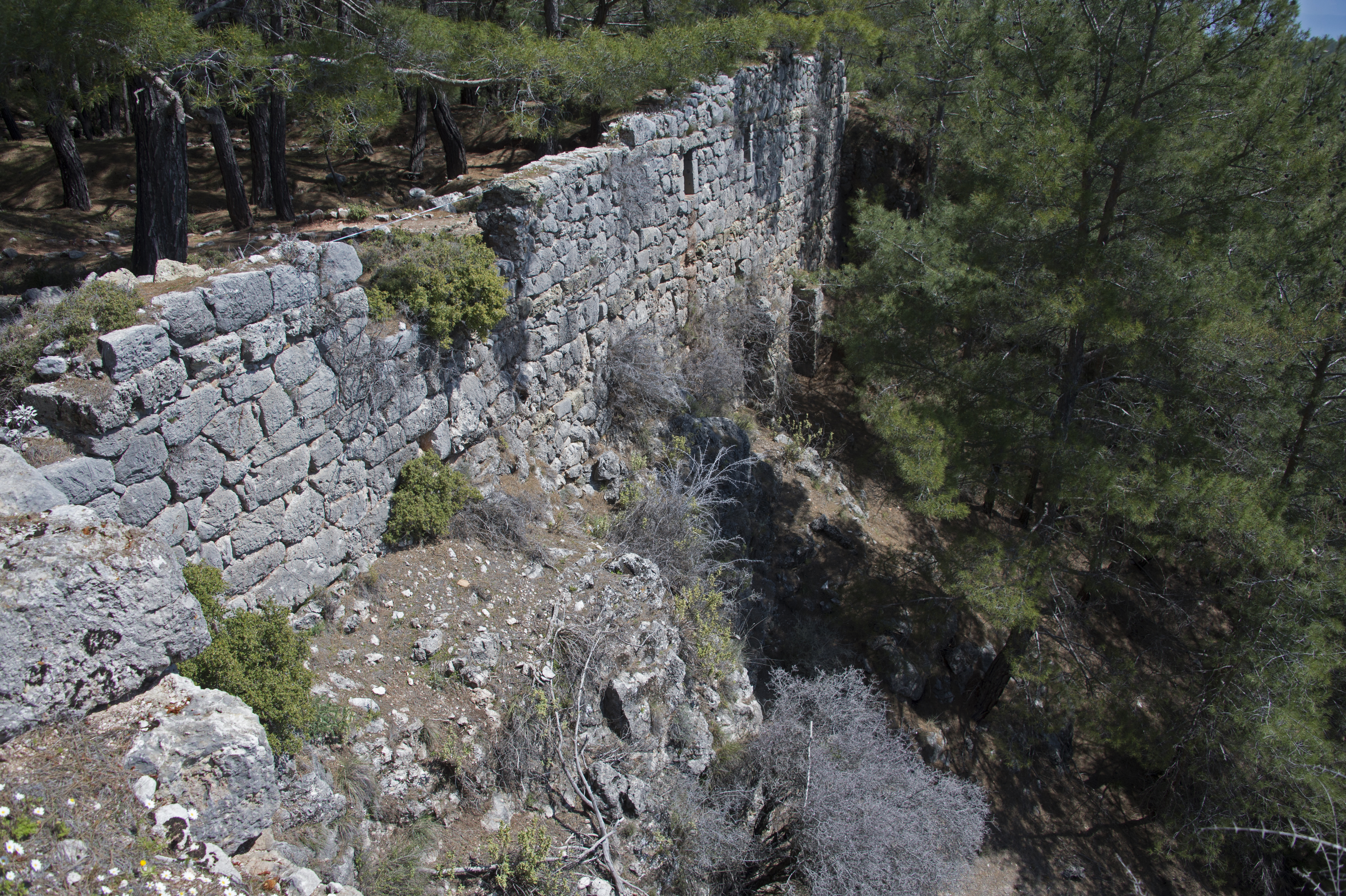
Cadianda City Wall

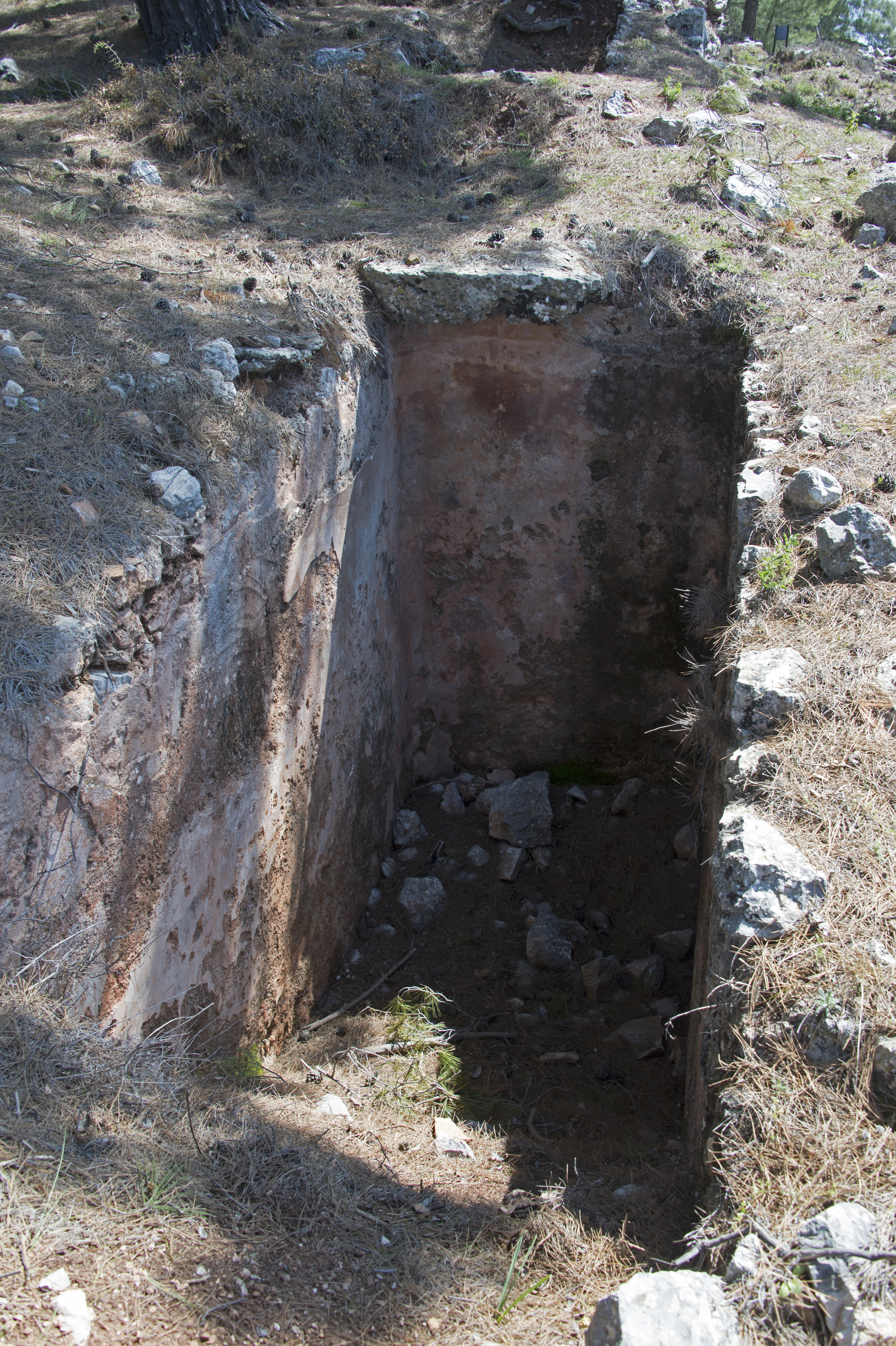
Cadianda Cistern

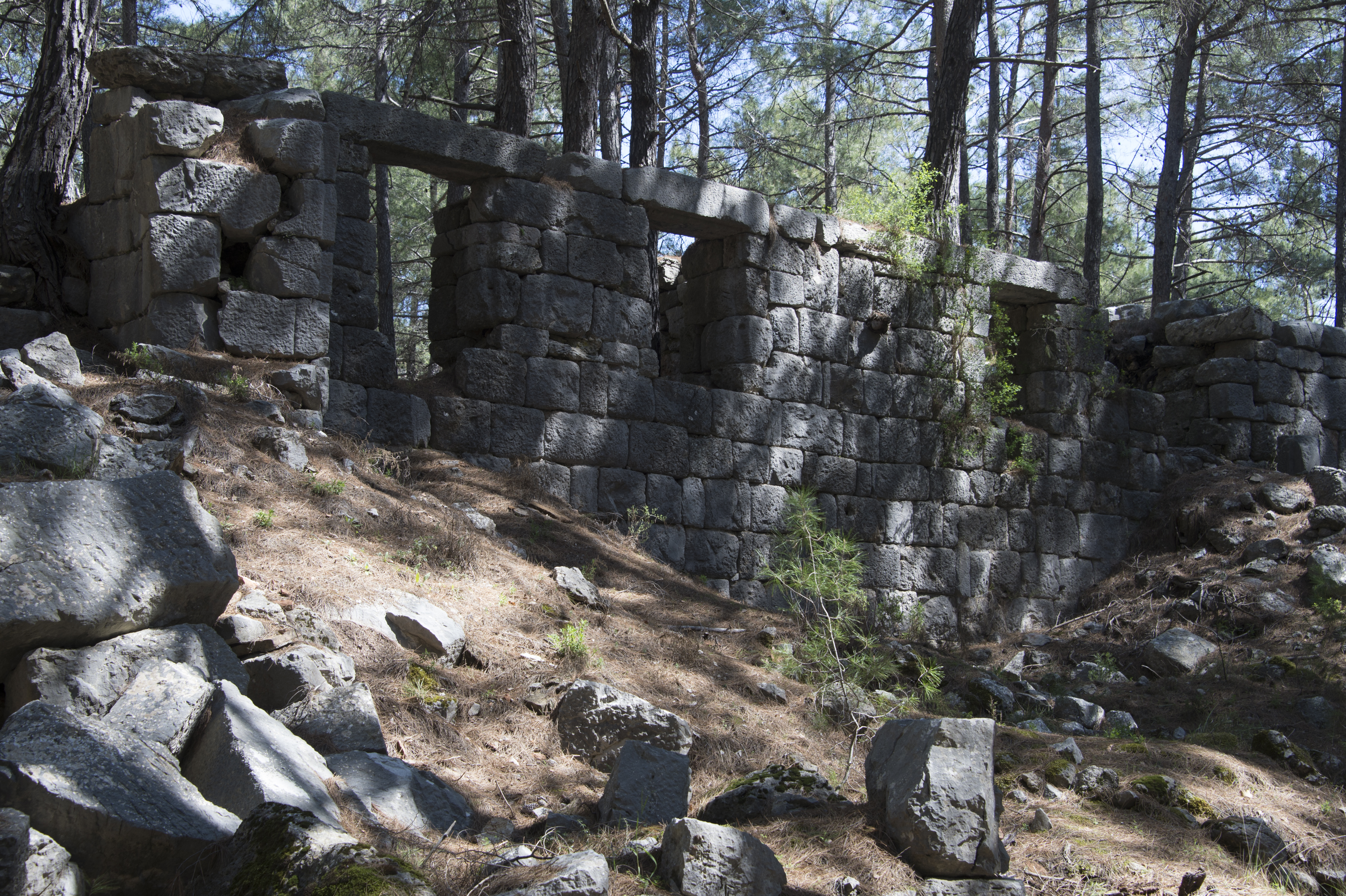
Cadianda Baths

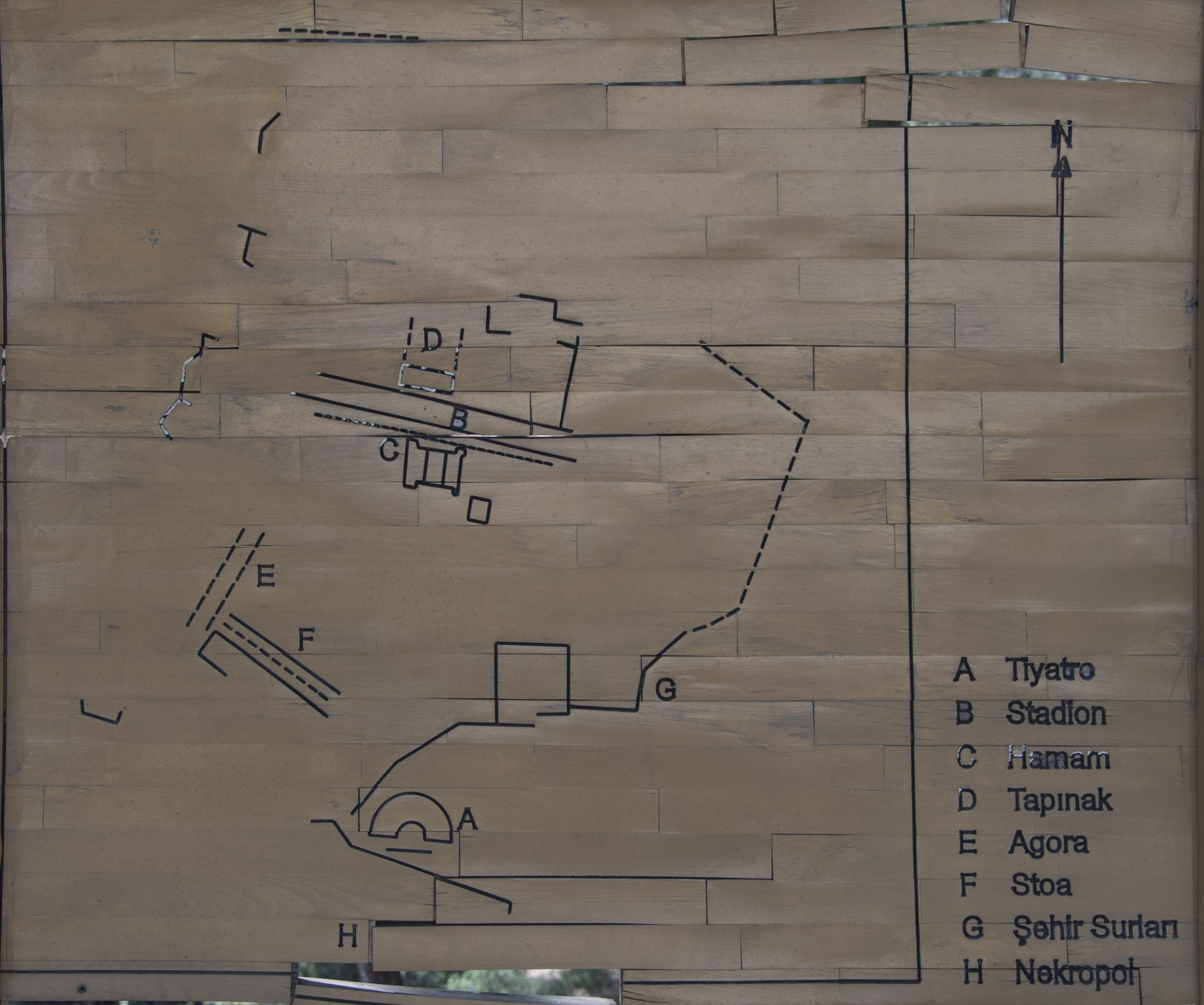
Cadianda Plan

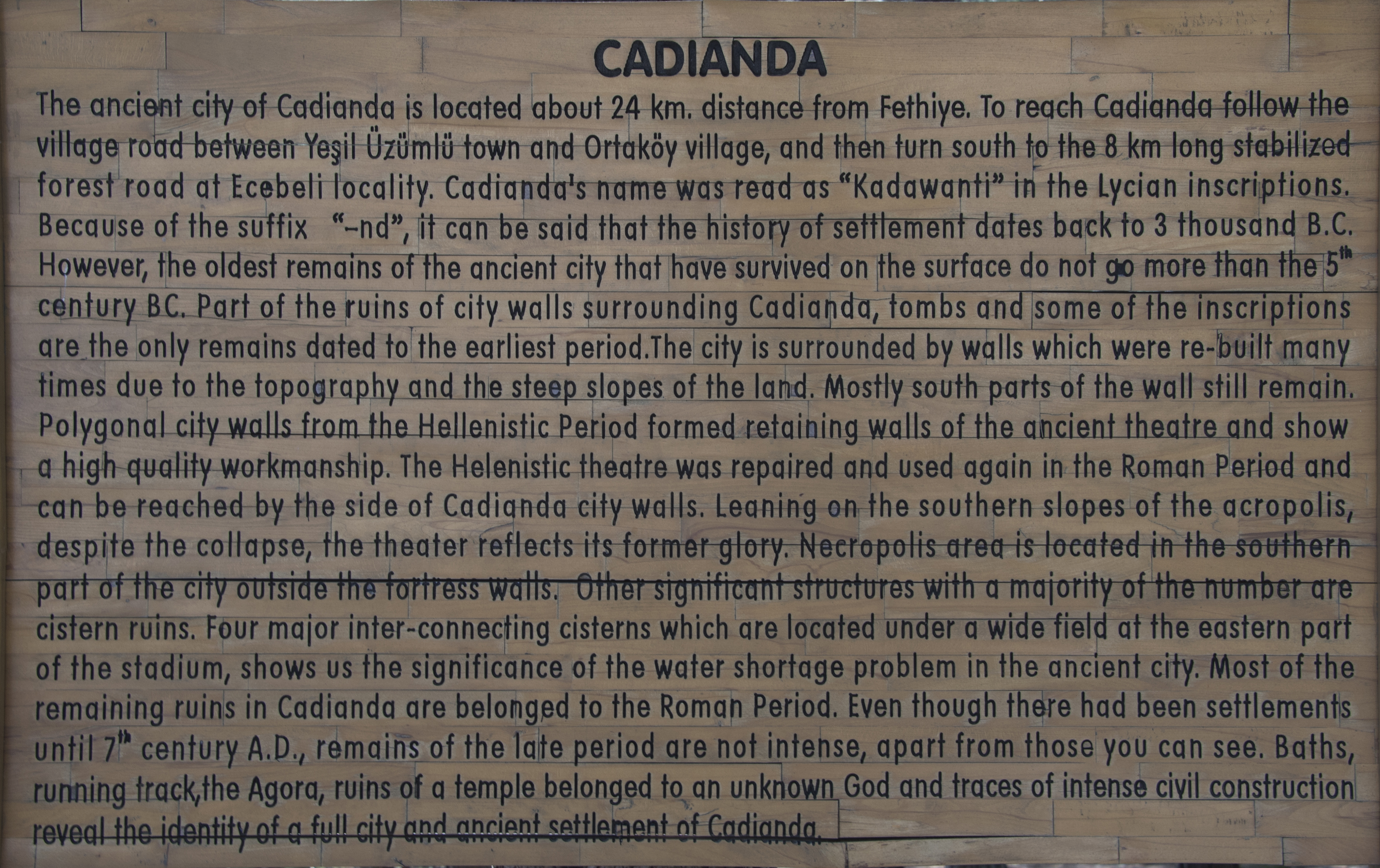
Cadianda Info board

== See also ==
- List of Lycian place names
