= Letoon trilingual =

Ancient Lycian inscription in Anatolia

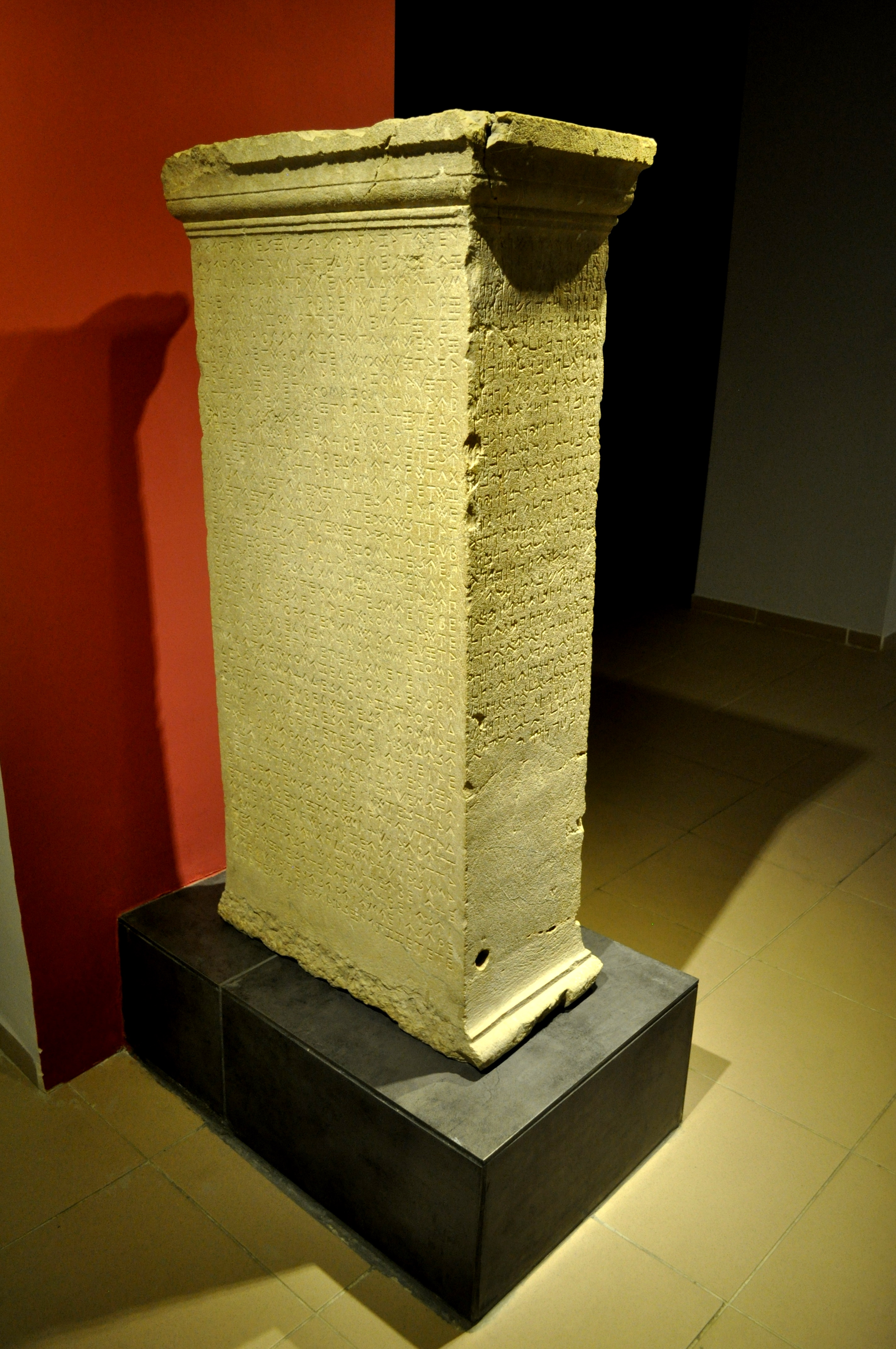
The Letoon trilingual stele in Fethiye Museum.

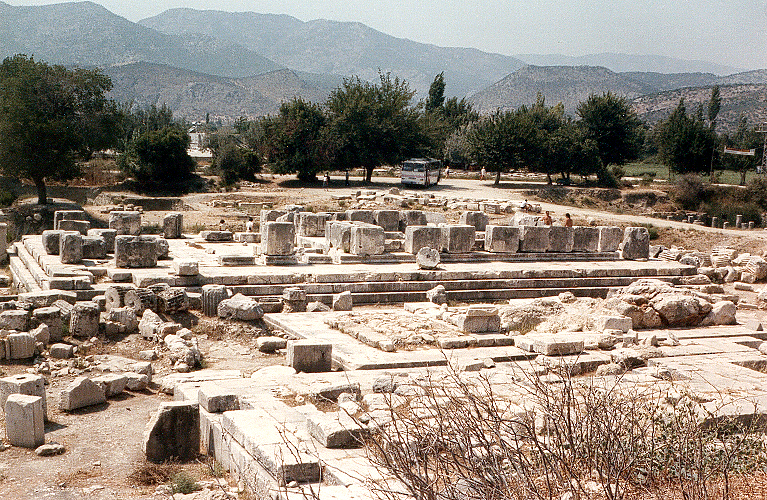
Lētōon temple complex. The foundations of the three temples are clearly visible.

The Letoon trilingual, or Xanthos trilingual, is an inscription in three languages: standard Lycian or Lycian A, Greek, and Aramaic covering the faces of a four-sided stone stele called the Letoon Trilingual Stele, discovered in 1973 during the archeological exploration of the Letoon temple complex (devoted to the goddess Leto), near Xanthos, ancient Lycia, in present-day Turkey. It was created when Lycia was under the sway of the Persian Achaemenid Empire. The inscription is a public record of a decree authorizing the establishment of a cult, with references to the deities, and provisions for officers in the new cult. The Lycian requires 41 lines; the Greek, 35 and the Aramaic, 27. They are not word-for-word translations, but each contains some information not present in the others. The Aramaic is somewhat condensed.

Although the use of the term "Letoon" with regard to the inscription and the stele is unequivocal, there is no standard name for either. Xanthos trilingual is sometimes used, which is to be distinguished from the Xanthos bilingual, meaning the Xanthos stele. However, sometimes Xanthos stele is used of the Letoon trilingual stele as well as for the tomb at Xanthos. Moreover, the term Xanthos trilingual (Lycian A, Lycian B, Greek) is sometimes used of the tomb at Xanthos. In the latter two cases only the context can provide clues as to which stele is meant. The Aramaic inscription is known as KAI 319.

== Find site ==
The Lētōon was a temple complex about 4 kilometers (2 mi) south of Xanthus, capital of ancient Lycia. The complex dates to as early as the 7th century BC and must have been a center for the Lycian League. In it were three temples to Lētō, Artemis and Apollō. The stele was found near the temple of Apollo. It has been removed to the museum at Fethiye. The entire site is currently under several inches of water.

== Date of the inscription ==
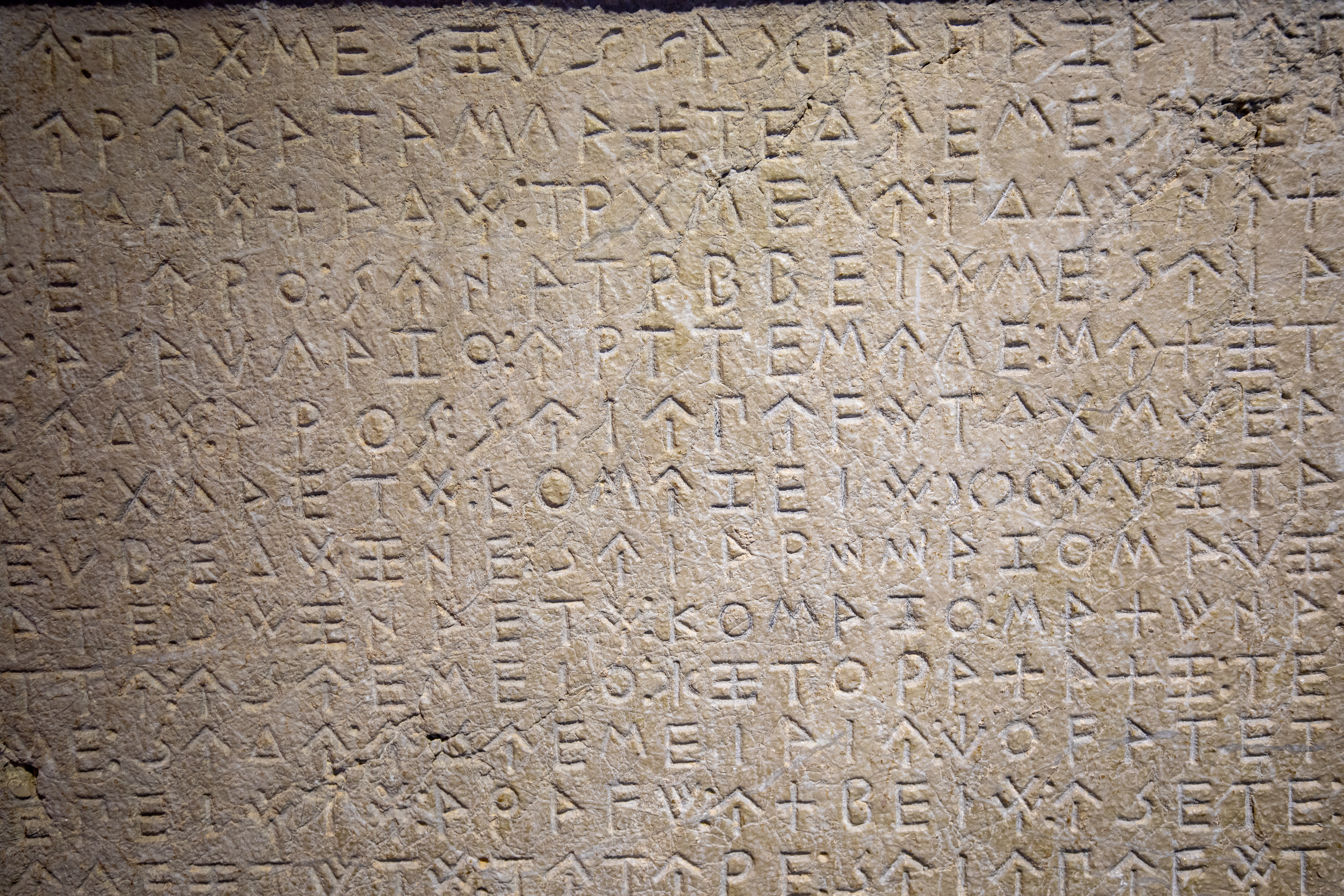
Close up of the text from the stele

The first five lines of the Aramaic version mention that the inscription was made in the first year of the reign of the Persian king, Artaxerxes, but does not say which Artaxerxes:

In the month Siwan, year 1 of King Artaxerxes. In the fortress of Arñna (Xanthos). Pixodarus, son of Katomno (Hecatomnus), the satrap who is in Karka (Caria) and Termmila (Lycia)....

If the king in question was Artaxerxes III Ochus, the date of the inscription would be the first year of his reign, hence 358 BC. But Hecatomnus is thought to have ruled from c. 395 to 377 BC and Pixodarus, son of Hecatomnus, was satrap of Caria and Lycia no earlier than 341/340. Therefore, the Persian king most likely was Artaxerxes IV Arses, son of Artaxerxes III, who took his father's name on coming to power. In that case the trilingual is dated to the first year of Artaxerxes IV, that is 337/336 BC.

== Summary of the text ==
Lines 1-5 of the Lycian text date the inscription to the government of Pixodaros.

Lines 5-8: the Xanthians introduce a cult for two gods, "the Kaunian Ruler and King Arkesimas".

Lines 9-11: a certain Simias is made priest, his priestship will be hereditary.

Lines 12-20: definition of the territory owned by the temple, and of the salary to be awarded to the priest.

Lines 20-24: on behalf of the temple a new tax is instituted, to be levied when a slave is liberated.

Lines 24-30: the revenues thereof shall be spent on sacrifices at regular times.

Lines 30-36: the citizens of Xanthos and the territory of Xanthos vow to execute faithfully those regulations.

== Sample of the Lycian text ==
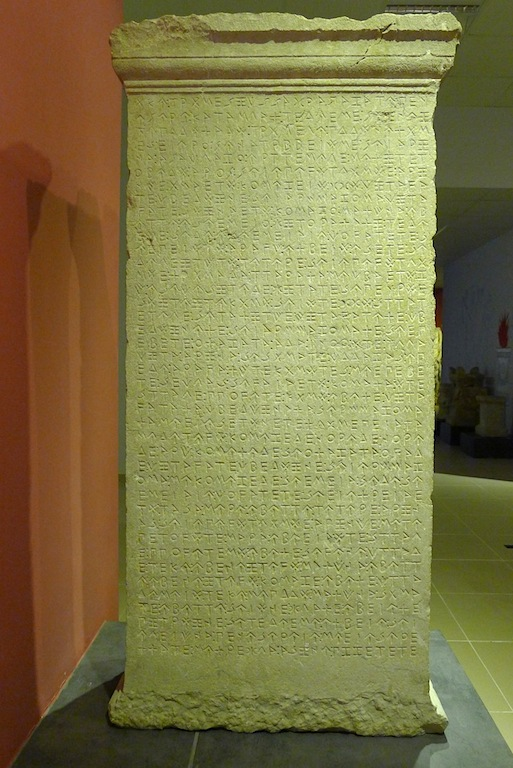
Letoon trilingual stele, portion in Lycian.

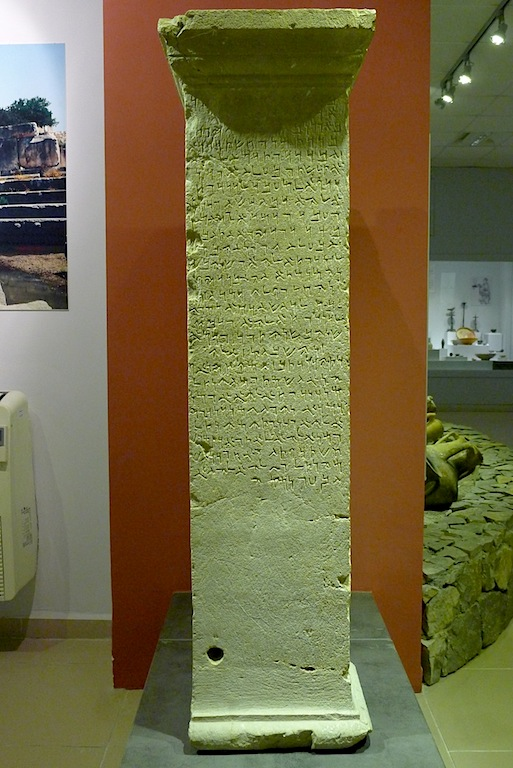
Letton trinlingual stele. Aramaic inscription.

Below is a transliteration of a sample of lines with an English translation:

1-2.	When Pixodarus, the son of Hecatomnus, became satrap of Lycia,	(1) Ẽke: trm̃misñ: xssaθrapazate: pigesere: (2) katamlah: tideimi:
2-5.	he appointed as rulers of Lycia Hieron (ijeru) and Apollodotos (natrbbejẽmi), and as governor (asaxlazu) of Xanthus, Artemelis (erttimeli).	sẽñneñte- (3) pddẽhadẽ: trm̃mile: pddẽnehm̃mis: (4) ijeru: senatrbbejẽmi: se(j)arñna: (5) asaxlazu: erttimeli:
5-6.	The citizens (arus) and the Xanthian neighboring residents decided	mehñtitubedẽ: (6) arus: se(j)epewẽtlm̃mẽi: arñnãi:
7-8.	to establish an altar to the Kaunian Ruler and the King Arkesimas	(7) m̃maitẽ: kumezijẽ: θθẽ: xñtawati: (8) xbidẽñni: se(j)arKKazuma: xñtawati:
9-10.	and they chose as priest Simias, the son of Kondorasis	(9) sẽñnaitẽ: kumazu: mahãna: ebette: (10) eseimiju: qñturahahñ: tideimi:
11.	and whoever is closest to Simias	(11) sede: eseimijaje: xuwatiti:
12.	and they granted him exemption (arawã) from taxes.	(12) seipijẽtẽ: arawã: ehbijẽ: esiti:
