= Domuz Island =

Island in Turkey

Native name: Domuz Adası
- Location within Turkey

Geography
- Location: Mediterranean Sea
- Coordinates: 36°39′41″N 28°53′58″E

Administration
- Turkey
- İl (province): Muğla Province
- İlçe: Fethiye

Domuz Island (Turkish: Domuz Adası, literally "Pig Island") is a Mediterranean island of Turkey. The island was popularly named after wild boars which were thought to live in the island.

== Geography ==
Administratively, the island is a part of Fethiye ilçe (district) of Muğla Province. It is situated in the Gulf of Fethiye at 36°39′41″N 28°53′58″E. The area of the island is about 1.5 kilometres (0.93 mi). The distance to the Tersane Island to the east is about 250 metres (820 ft) and to the Kapıdağ Peninsula (Dalaman) of the mainland (Anatolia) to the south west is 100 metres (330 ft). There are pine and olive trees on the island, and it is a popular spot for daily excursion tours in the gulf.

== History ==
There are ruins, in and around the island. But the island now is uninhabited. During the Ottoman era, the island was purchased by Abbas II of Egypt, an Ottoman viceroy of Egypt. During the Turkish Republic, it was sold to Sedat Simavi a journalist and a businessman. Simavi was the owner of the Hürriyet newspaper and the island was also called "Hürriyet Island".
