= Mausolus =

Satrap of Caria from 377 BCE to 353 BCE

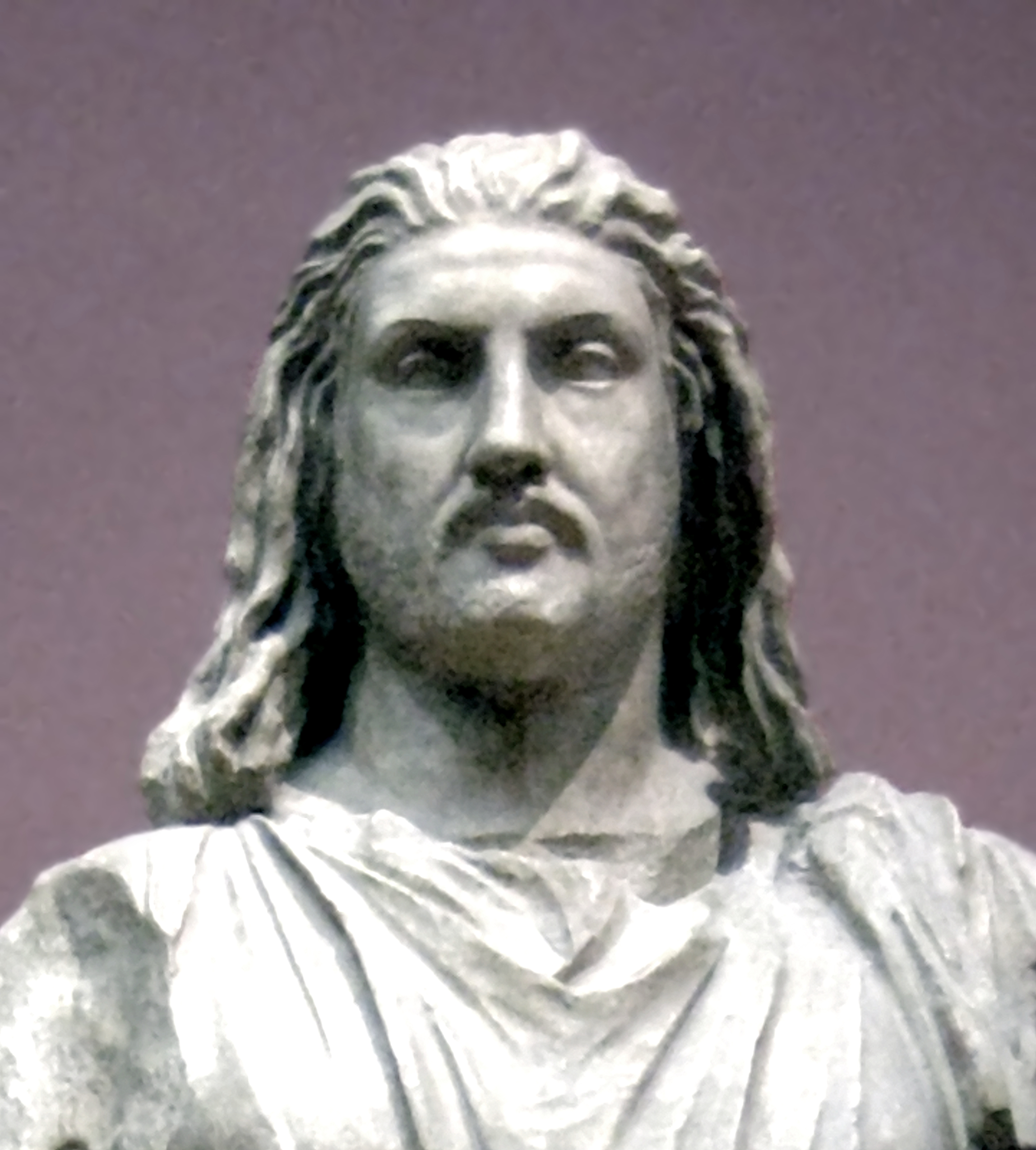
- Mausolus, 377–353 BCE. Casting from the Pushkin museum.

Satrap of Caria
- In office: 377–353 BCE
- Predecessor: Hecatomnus
- Successor: Artemisia II
- Born: Caria (modern-day Turkey)
- Died: 353 BCE; Halicarnassus, Caria, Achaemenid Empire (modern-day Bodrum, Muğla, Turkey)
- Burial: Mausoleum of Halicarnassus
- Consort: Artemisia II
- House: Hecatomnids
- Father: Hecatomnus

Mausolus (Ancient Greek: Μαύσωλος or Μαύσσωλλος, Carian: [𐊪𐊠]𐊲𐊸𐊫𐊦 Mauśoλ) was a ruler of Caria (377–353 BCE) and a satrap of the Achaemenid Empire. He enjoyed the status of king or dynast by virtue of the powerful position created by his father Hecatomnus, who was the first satrap of Caria from the hereditary Hecatomnid dynasty. Besides Caria, Mausolus also ruled Lycia and parts of Ionia and the Dodecanese islands. He is best known for his monumental tomb and one of the Seven Wonders of the Ancient World, the Mausoleum at Halicarnassus, the construction of which has traditionally been ascribed to his wife and sister Artemisia.

== Name ==
Mausolus' name is only known directly in Greek (Ancient Greek: Μαύσωλος or Μαύσσωλλος). It is clearly of Carian origin, though, and would have been written as *𐊪𐊠𐊲𐊸𐊫𐊦 (*Mauśoλ) or similar. This is a compound name perhaps meaning "much blessed". The first part, *Ma-, may mean "much", similar to the same word in Hieroglyphic Luwian. The second part, *-uśoλ, meaning "blessed", is very common in Carian onomastics. Other examples include just Uśoλ (𐊲𐊸𐊫𐊦 = Ancient Greek: Υσσωλλος, "blessed"), Šaruśoλ (𐤭𐊠𐊥𐊲𐊸𐊫𐊦 = Σαρυσ(σ)ωλλος, "highly blessed"), and Pnuśoλ/Punwśoλ (𐊷𐊵𐊲𐊸𐊫𐊦/𐊷𐊲𐊵𐊿𐊸𐊫𐊦 = Πονυσσωλλος, "blessed by all").

== Early life ==
Mausolus was the eldest son of Hecatomnus, a native Carian who became the satrap of Caria shortly after Tissaphernes died, c. 395 – c. 392 BCE. Mausolus succeeded his father upon Hecatomnus' death in 377 BCE. The two may have shared the rule of Caria in the early 370s BCE, though, shortly before the death of Hecatomnus. Their close relationship is illustrated in the family scenes from the sarcophagus of the tomb of Hecatomnus and Aba. They were also depicted alongside one another in a statue group from Caunos. Whether Mausolus held any real or ceremonial office before the period of his reign proper, however, is speculative.

== Reign ==
Mausolus

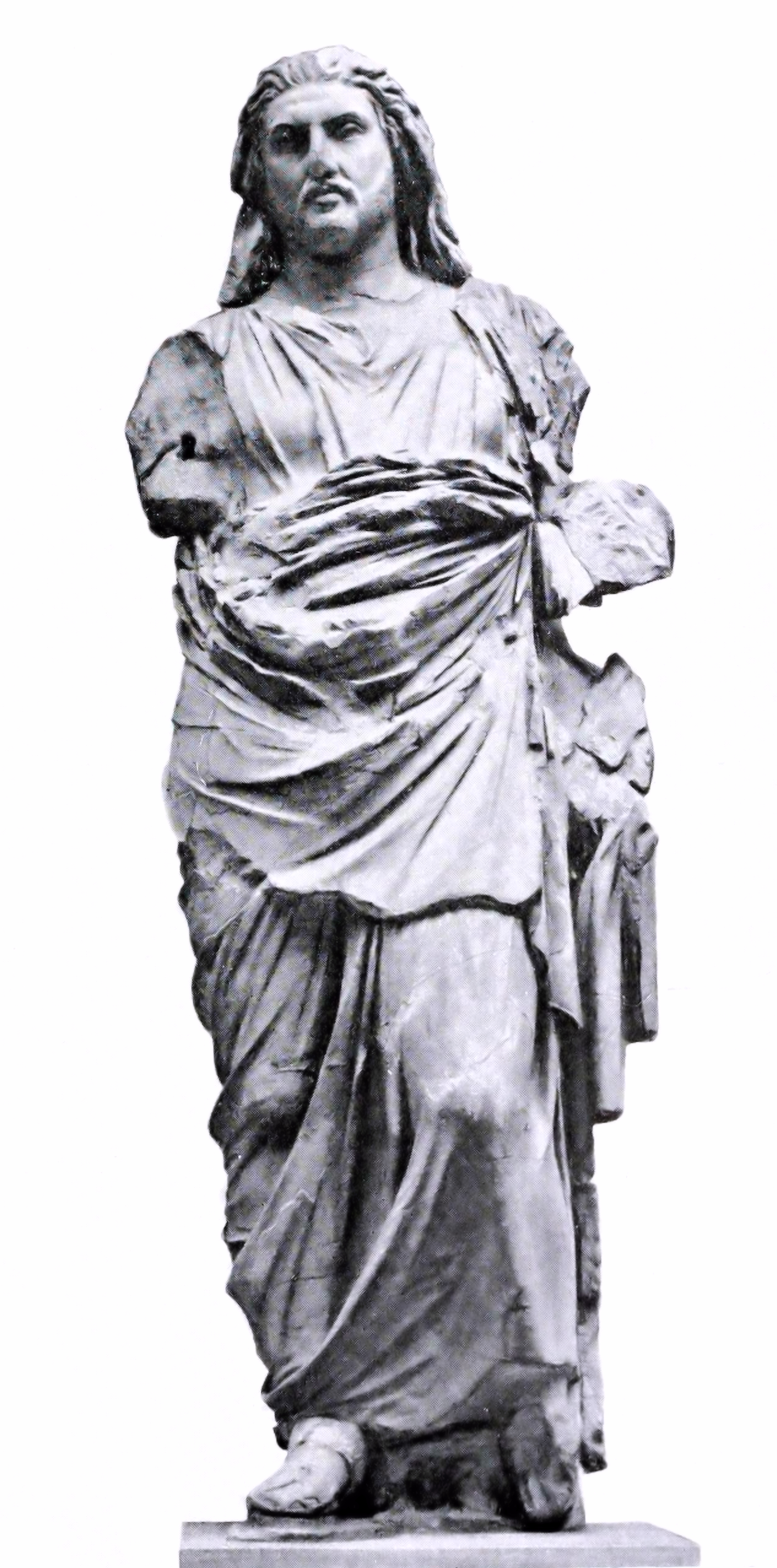
Early 20th century photograph

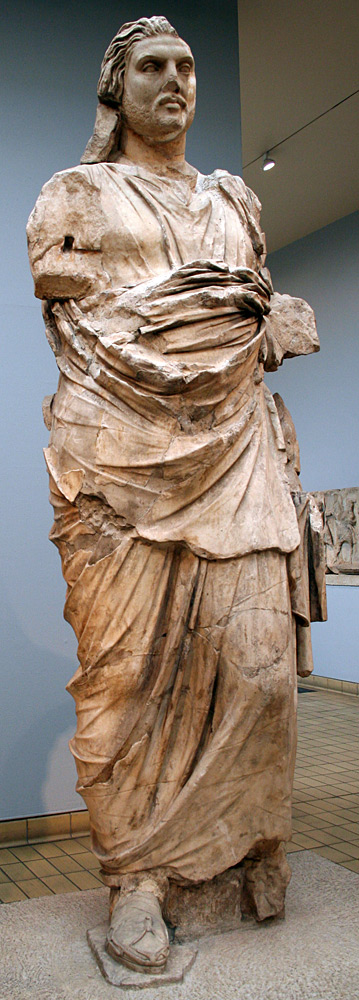
Modern photograph

Statue of a Hecatomnid ruler from the Mausoleum at Halicarnassus, traditionally identified as Mausolus (British Museum)

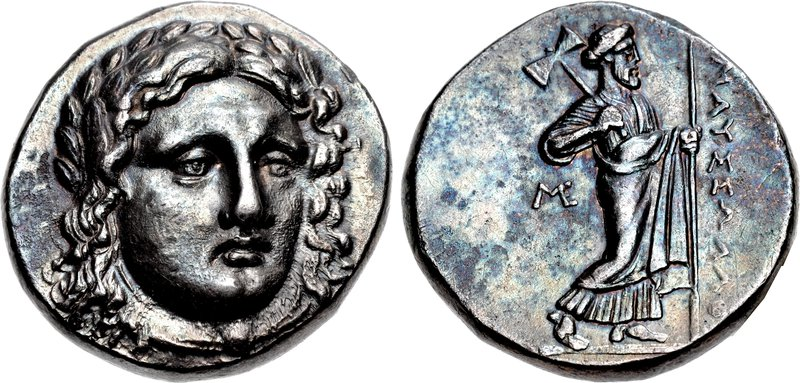
Coinage of Maussolos as Achaemenid satrap of Caria. Head of Apollo facing, Zeus Labrandos standing, legend MAYΣΣΩΛΛO ("of Mausolus"). c. 377/6 – c. 353/2.

Mausolus became satrap when his father Hecatomnus died in 377/6 BCE. He ruled alongside his wife, who was also his sister, Artemisia (known as Artemisia II to avoid confusion with the earlier Artemisia I Lygdamis). Because the two had no children, and incest of this type was not otherwise known in Caria, it is thought that their unusual marriage was entirely symbolic. Although only Mausolus was ever referred to as satrap, it is clear that Artemisia had some political authority as joint dynast while the two were still alive.

=== Revolt of the Satraps ===
Mausolus participated in the Revolt of the Satraps, a long and complex affair in which many satraps in the west of the Achaemenid Empire rebelled against Artaxerxes II Memnon, mostly during the 360s BCE. The Revolt of the Satraps, also called the Great Revolt, was not a coordinated affair, but consisted of multiple separate rebellions throughout Anatolia. Mausolus primarily participated on the side of Artaxerxes, although Greek sources say that he also briefly rebelled against him.

Diodorus Siculus includes Mausolus in his list of satraps who rebelled against Artaxerxes II. Also in this list were Tachos of Egypt, Ariobarzanes of Hellespontine Phrygia, Orontes of Mysia, Autophradates of Lydia, and miscellaneous populations of Anatolia and Phoenicia. With the majority of Anatolia, the Levant, and Egypt in revolt, Diodorus said that half of Artaxerxes' revenues were cut off from him. Another participant was King Agesilaus II of Sparta, who was a guest-friend of Mausolus.

The most evidence for Mausolus' participation in the Great Satraps' Revolt, however, is on the side of his nominal sovereign. Mausolus, together with Autophradates the satrap of Lydia, led the siege of Adramyttium in 366 BCE at the request of Artaxerxes. Ariobarzanes had taken refuge there after Autophradates had driven him out of Assos. According to Xenophon, Mausolus was allegedly persuaded to abandon the siege by Agesilaus, whom Mausolus and Tachos of Egypt provided an escort to escape safely. This may be a sign that Mausolus only defied his overlord covertly, as there is no evidence that he actually made war against Artaxerxes.

Diodorus also tells us that Mausolus and Autophradates, who secretly did not pursue Ariobarzanes, assisted Orontes of Mysia in his later rebellion in 362 BCE. Unlike Tachos or Agesilaus, however, Mausolus and Artemisia are mostly absent from narratives of Orontes' revolt, and there is no evidence that they took any concrete action against Artaxerxes II.

Mausolus was not punished for his alleged participation in the Revolt of the Satraps, unlike more flagrant rebels such as Datames or Ariobarzanes. He remained in office after the revolt was squashed in 362/1 BCE and was even rewarded by being given Lycia to govern over.

=== Lycia ===
After the Satraps' Revolt, Mausolus and Artemisia came to rule Lycia, adding this territory to the southeast of Caria to their satrapy. Lycia had first been conquered by the Achaemenids at the same time as Ionia and Caria, by Harpagus, a general under Cyrus the Great. After the time of Harpagus, however, Achaemenid presence in Lycia was minimal and contested by the Delian League. The country came to be ruled by a series of minor dynasts, such as Kuprlli and Kheriga of Xanthos, Erbbina of Telmessos, and Arppakhu of Phellos. Pericles (Lycian: 𐊓𐊁𐊕𐊆𐊋𐊍𐊁, Perikle) of Limyra, a dynast based in eastern Lycia, came to dominate all of Lycia in the 370s and 360s BCE, breaking the historical dominance of the western dynasts based in and around Xanthos. He cast himself as a native Lycian fighting for liberation against Persians in western Lycia; one inscription explicitly describes his rival Arttum̃para as a Mede (Lycian: 𐊀𐊕𐊗𐊗𐊒𐊐𐊓𐊀𐊕𐊀:𐊎𐊁𐊅𐊁, Arttum̃para mede). Arttum̃para may have been one of two Achaemenid officials in Lycia whom Pericles contested, the other being Mithrapata. By rejecting Persian rule in the 370s and 360s BCE, Pericles was participating in the Revolt of the Satraps. Pericles' domination of an independent Lycia was ended by the Autophradates, the satrap of Lydia, at the end of the great revolt c. 362 BCE. Autophradates ruled Lycia himself for as 'king' and/or 'satrap' (TL 61: 𐊚𐊏𐊚 𐊜𐊑𐊗𐊀𐊇𐊀𐊗𐊀 𐊇𐊀𐊗𐊀𐊓𐊕𐊅𐊅𐊀𐊗𐊁𐊛𐊁, ẽnẽ xñtawata Wataprddatehe, "while Autophradates was king"; TL 40d: 𐊜𐊖𐊖𐊀𐊅𐊕𐊀𐊓𐊀 𐊓𐊀[𐊕𐊈]𐊀, xssadrapa Pa[rz]a, "Persian satrap"). Lycia had returned to the Achaemenid control. Autophradates ruled for only a short period, though, and rule of Lycia was transferred to Mausolus sometime in the period c. 362 – c. 353 BCE.

Mausolus ruled Lycia as satrap in the later part of his reign. From this time onwards, independent Lycian coins were no longer struck, and instead coins of Mausolus and his successors circulated in Lycia. Although he did not conquer Lycia, he may have been militarily active there, as Stephanus of Byzantium tells us that he campaigned in Milyas to the north of Lycia. How Mausolus and Artemisia governed Lycia is not clear. The Pseudo-Aristotelian Economics records that Mausolus had a hyparch (ὕπαρχος, 'deputy') active in Lycia, although this account is far from trustworthy. A later trilingual inscription shows that their brother Pixodarus had garrison-commanders in Lycia (Ancient Greek: ἐπιμελητής), which may have been true in Mausolus' time as well.

Mausolus and Artemisia made an alliance with Phaselis, a city at the eastern border of Lycia with Pamphilia, showing the extent of their domain. Theodectes of Phaselis, a tragic poet, wrote a play called Mausolus to honour the satrap at his funeral.

=== Social War ===
Mausolus and Artemisia cooperated with the rebels against Athens in the Social War (357–355 BCE), by which they helped to extend their authority among the Greek islands and cities neighbouring Caria.

After the Peace of Antalcidas concluded the Corinthian War in 387 BCE, Artaxerxes II had given control of the Greek cities of Anatolia to his satraps, while guaranteeing the independence of the Greek off the coast of Anatolia. King Agesilaus II of Sparta was deputised to enforce this peace among the Greeks. The Athenians subsequently formed what is called the Second Athenian League (in contrast to the earlier Delian League) as a counterbalance to Spartan hegemony. Among the Greek communities which founded this alliance in 378 BCE were Rhodes, Chios, and Byzantium. All three rebelled against Athens in 357 BCE, after the Athenians had begun to collect financial contributions (syntaxeis) from their allies and established an aggressive colony (a cleruchy) on Samos in the 360s BCE.

Demosthenes described the outbreak of the Social War is his speech On the Liberty of the Rhodians: "We were charged by the Chians, Byzantines and Rhodians with plotting against them, and that was why they concerted the last war against us; but ... Mausolus [was] the prime mover and instigator in the business". In this speech, our main source for Carian involvement in the Social War, Demosthenes makes clear that Mausolus and Artemisia supported the rebels in naval warfare against Athens. Although the precise causes of the Social War are obscure, it may be the case that Mausolus himself incited it in order to expand his sphere of influence into the neighbouring Greek islands of the Dodecanese.

The Social War ended quickly in 355 BCE. The Athenians were already weakened after Philip II of Macedon captured Amphipolis; they suffered several naval defeats to the rebels, and the city was nearly bankrupt. The intervention of Artaxerxes III set the terms of the peace. Either during or shortly after the Social War, the Carian satraps controlled the Greek islands of Rhodes, Cos, and Chios, in part because they had undermined Athenian authority in the region.

Rhodes, which had previously been governed by a democracy aligned with Athens, came to be ruled instead by an oligarchy backed by a Carian garrison. Vitruvius relates a story about how, when Mausolus died shortly after the end of the Social War, the Rhodian democrats briefly overthrew their Hecatomnid-aligned oligarchy and unsuccessfully rebelled against Artemisia.

Mausolus also invaded parts of Ionia and controlled other at undetermined points in his reign. As well as their new capital at Halicarnassus, Mausolus and Artemisia had considerable control over the other Greek cities on the coast of Caria, such as Iasos, Miletus, and Cnidus. Part of this control had diplomatic elements. For example, the astronomer Eudoxus of Cnidus, who developed a cosmic model of concentric spheres, lived at the court of Mausolus and may have helped steer the politics of Cnidus as the satrap wished. Mausolus' rule was enforced by violence, though. Polyaenus reports that Mausolus had deputised his brother Idrieus to capture the fortified town of Latmus; later, he pretended to return the Latmian hostages which Idrieus had captured, and after winning the trust of the townspeople, ambushing the city at night after all the inhabitants had left its walls to watch his military procession. Separately, the same author writes how Mausolus' sister and wife Artemisia captured the same town by a similar deception, distracting the Latmians with a religious procession of women, eunuchs, and musicians, instead of soldiers.

=== Tyrannical reputation ===
Mausolus was not beloved by all his subjects. Mausolus appears as a stereotypical despot or tyrant in the accounts of contemporary Greeks. The Economics attributed to Aristotle tells many stories about the injustice of his rule, in part because he needed to raise funds to pay tribute to the Achaemenid Great King. He supposedly deceived the people of Mylasa by telling them that Artaxerxes II Memnon was about to attack the unwalled city; after the local elites gave much money to Mausolus so that he could build walls for Mylasa, he told them that omens prevented him from providing anything. The city was not attacked and Mausolus kept his citizens' funds. Polyaenus tells a similar story about how he lied to his subjects that Artaxerxes threatened to take dominion; he showed them his treasures, which he would sell to keep it, and so his subjects willingly gave him an immense amount of goods, ignorant of his deception.

Mausolus' hyparch Condalos was also authoritarian, according to the Economics. While collecting money for Mausolus, Condalos noted that the people of Lycia wore their hair long, unlike the Carians. He told his Lycian subjects that Artaxerxes demanded hair to make wigs (προκομία) for his horses. Mausolus therefore demanded that the Lycians shave their heads and send him their hair. If the Lycians did not want to shave their heads, they could pay their Carian governors in money instead of hair, and Mausolus could buy hair from the Greeks instead. The entire thing was a sham. No hair was sent anywhere, but Condalos and Mausolus made a lot of money.

Not all of Mausolus' subjects accepted his authoritarian rule easily. A series of inscriptions from Iasos and Mylasa record how Mausolus punished nobles who conspired against him. The most dramatic is from 355/4 BCE, late in Mausolus' reign, when he survived an assassination attempt by disaffected subjects during the royal procession at the yearly festival at Labraunda. A similar plot had been thwarted in Mylasa over a decade earlier (367/6 BCE). Alongside these attempts on Mausolus' life, he also punished a group of brothers who conspired to desecrate a statue of his father Hekatomnos in Mylasa (361/0 BCE). These same brothers were celebrated in Iasos, where the city granted them proxeny around this time, perhaps in defiance of Mausolus. Nonetheless, Iasos still punished a series of unknown conspirators against Mausolus in the 360s BCE, putting their property to auction.

== Building projects ==
Mausolus and Artemisia moved their capital from Mylasa to Halicarnassus early in their reign. Halicarnassus had historically been a Greek colony with a sizeable native population of Carians and Leleges. The city was refounded by Mausolus, being rebuilt on a new grid pattern. Its population was enlarged through a process of synoecism: residents of Carian villages nearby were relocated to the new capital city. Pliny the Elder, who incorrectly attributed the synoecism to Alexander the Great, lists the villages assimilated into Halicarnassus as Theangela, Sibde, Medmasa, Euralium, Pedasus, and Telmissus.

The city of Halicarnassus, newly rebuilt by Mausolus and Artemisia, had a number of Greek features, including a large theatre and agora. New city walls expanded into harbour fortifications, turning Halicarnassus into the primary port of the Hecatomnid navy. The Hecatomnids built themselves a palace on the promontory of Zephyrion, next to the older Temple of Apollo, which has since been built over by the medieval Castle of St Peter.

The synoecism of Halicarnassus may have been inspired by the earlier synoecism of Rhodes, when the three major Greek cities of the island (Ialysus, Camirus, and Lindus) came together the found the city of Rhodes as their capital in c. 408 BCE. Rhodes and Halicarnassus had close ties. Both claimed mythic Dorian ancestry (although the people of Halicarnassus spoke Ionian Greek) and both cities were allied within the Doric Hexapolis in the Archaic period.

Another former island member of the Doric Hexapolis, Cos, underwent synoecism shortly after Halicarnassus. This similar synoecism of Cos may have been politically induced by Mausolus — especially because Demosthenes said that Idrieus controlled Cos while he was satrap — although the evidence is inconclusive. Other cities and towns which may have been relocated or rebuilt by Mausolus or his family include Latmus (which became Heraclea at Latmus), Cnidus (which moved from Datça to Tekir around this time), and Priene (which may instead have been relocated by Alexander the Great after the time of Mausolus).

As well as cities, Mausolus rebuilt major Carian religious sanctuaries at Amyzon, Labraunda, and Sinuri. All three were located in the Carian mountains, away from major urban centres. Religious activity included annual processions up the mountain to the new monumental temples at these sanctuaries. Investment at Labraunda by both Mausolus and his brother Idrieus was especially intensive; the annual procession to Labraunda from Mylasa became a centrepiece of the Hecatomnid royal cult.

=== 'Hellenisation' and the Ionian Renaissance ===
Mausolus embraced Hellenic culture to an extent. It is debated whether Caria underwent "Hellenisation", "Carianisation", or a complex combination of the two (e.g. creolisation), under his watch.

All the original construction at Halicarnassus was distinctive of the so-called Ionian Renaissance, which the Hecatomnids sponsored throughout their territories, and which continued in the early Hellenistic Period at sites such as Priene. Many cities and religious centres in and around Caria bear features of the Ionian Renaissance following direct sponsorship by Mausolus and his family.

=== Mausoleum at Halicarnassus ===
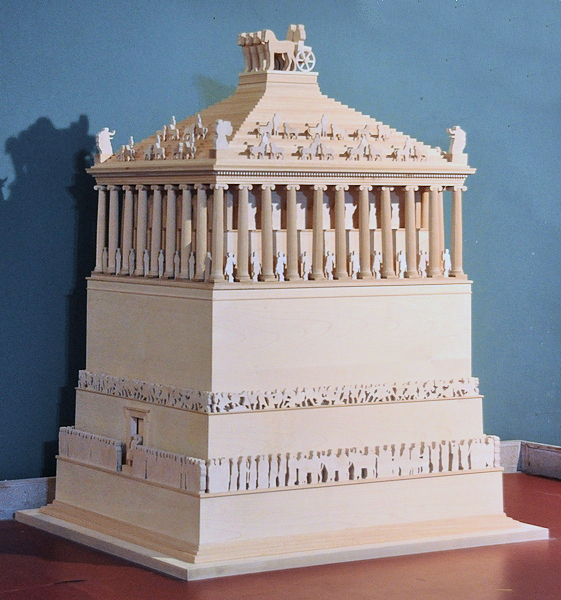
Model of the Mausoleum at Halicarnassus, at the Bodrum Museum of Underwater Archaeology.

Mausolus is best known by his monumental tomb: the Mausoleum at Halicarnassus. Tradition maintains that it was erected and named for him by order of his wife and sister Artemisia after his death. The tomb was only finished after her death. It is likely that construction began while Mausolus was still alive, and that he oversaw it alongside Artemisia.

The Mausoleum at Halicarnassus was emblematic of the Ionian Renaissance, combining Greek architectural styles with those of Anatolian structures such as the Nereid Monument at Xanthos in Lycia. The leading craftsmen who designed and built the Mausoleum included famous Greeks : the architects Satyrus and Pythis, and the sculptors Scopas of Paros, Leochares, Bryaxis and Timotheus. The tomb of Hecatomnus in the centre of Mylasa has been considered an unfinished 'proto-Mausoleum', having a similar terrace structure but lacking similar above-ground elements.

The tomb was famous even in antiquity. Although the Mausoleum (Ancient Greek: Μαυσωλεῖον) was named for Mausolus, the term mausoleum has come to be used generically for any grand above-ground tomb. This was true in antiquity; Martial used the term in reference to the Mausoleum of Augustus (died AD 14). Antipater of Sidon listed the Mausoleum as one of the Seven Wonders of the Ancient World.

The site of the Mausoleum and a few remains can still be seen in the Turkish town of Bodrum (ancient Halicarnassus). The majority of surviving sculptural elements are now kept in the British Museum, where they were taken by Charles Thomas Newton in the 1850s. Modern excavations of the site of the Mausoleum, as with other archaeological features of ancient Halicarnassus at Bodrum, have been led by the Danish Archaeological Project in conjunction with the Bodrum Museum of Underwater Archaeology.

== Death ==
Mausolus died shortly after the failed assassination attempt at Labraunda. Diodorus Siculus tells us that he died in 353/2 BCE. Modern consensus agrees with this date, in part because Mausolus was known to have participated in the Social War (357–355 BCE), but had died by the time Demosthenes wrote his speech On the Liberty of the Rhodians (351 BCE). Pliny the Elder incorrectly claimed that Mausolus died in 351 BCE, which is when his sister and wife Artemisia died. It is unknown what he died of.

When Mausolus died, his remains were interred in the Mausoleum at Halicarnassus, which he and Artemisia had been building while they were still alive. It is likely that the Mausoleum functioned as a heroön and that Mausolus received cult worship after his death. Archaeological evidence suggests that worship of Mausolus continued until approximately the mid-2nd century BCE.

Artemisia threw a lavish funeral for Mausolus, including games and ceremonies, in which many distinguished Greeks participated, many of whom were students of Isocrates from Greek cities within the Hecatomnid sphere of influence. Theopompus of Chios won the prose competition, defeating Isocrates. This may have been Isocrates of Apollonia, rather than the more famous Isocrates of Athens, who would have been very old at the time. Theodectes of Phaselis won the verse competition with a tragic play entitled Mausolus. This coming together of famous and influential Greeks at Halicarnassus on the occasion of Mausolus' death, overseen by Artemisia, may be why she became so renowned for her grief in later tradition.

Mausolus and Artemisia had no children. After he died, his sister-wife Artemisia ruled alone for a short period before she herself died (353–351 BCE). She was then succeeded by her brother and sister Idrieus and Ada, who were themselves married. There is no evidence that Artemisia was ever formally a satrap of the Achaemenid Empire, rather than just a local dynast. Only the men of the Hekatomnid family were ever referred to as satraps, as far as we know. So, although Artemisia succeeded Mausolus in real terms, his successor to the office of satrap was probably his brother Idrieus.

Centuries after the death of Mausolus, Lucian of Samosata wrote a dialogue between the deceased satrap and the philosopher Diogenes the Cynic, conversing in the afterlife. Although Mausolus ruled widely as satrap, was rich in his lifetime, and left behind a magnificent tomb in Halicarnassus, Diogenes taunts him, as they both have nothing after their deaths.

== Bibliography ==
- Simon Hornblower: Mausolus, Clarendon Press, Oxford 1982
