= Tersane Island =

Island in Turkey

Native name: Tersane Adası
- Location within Turkey

Geography
- Location: Mediterranean Sea
- Coordinates: 36°40′14″N 28°55′09″E

Administration
- Turkey
- İl (province): Muğla Province
- İlçe: Fethiye

Tersane Island (Turkish: Tersane Adası, literally Shipyard island) is a Mediterranean island of Turkey.

== Location ==
Administratively, the island is a part of Fethiye ilçe (district) of Muğla Province. It is situated in the Gulf of Fethiye at 36°40′14″N 28°55′09″E. It is separated from Domuz Island by a narrow channel to the west. The triangular island has a surface area of about 2.5 square kilometres (0.97 sq mi) . There are three small bays and the bay at the north west corner is well protected. The northeast part of the bay has a very shallow harbour.

== History ==
The ancient name of the island was Telandria (Ancient Greek: Τηλανδρία) and Telandros (Ancient Greek: Τήλανδρος). There are ruins from the Lycian era. During the Ottoman Empire age the island was probably a ship building and repair harbor. the population of the island left the island following the Population exchange agreement between Greece and Turkey. Although the island is currently uninhabited there is a restaurant with a quay for the yachters.
