= Kızılada, Fethiye =

Island in Turkey

Kızılada
- Location within Turkey

Geography
- Location: Fethiye Bay
- Coordinates: 36.65772°N 29.04650°E
- Adjacent to: Mediterranean Sea

Administration
- Turkey
- Province: Muğla
- District: Fethiye

Kızılada, a.k.a. Kızıl Ada, anciently Lagusa or Lagousa or Lagussa or Lagoussa is a Turkish island in the Mediterranean Sea situated in the Fethiye Bay, southwestern Turkey. It is 4 mi (6.4 km) off the coast of Fethiye district in Muğla Province.

The island hosts also the 19-century Kızılada Lighthouse on its southern point, which was redeveloped into a seafood restaurant in 2007 and a hostel with nine rooms in 2008. Kızılada is a popular stopover for boat tours around Fethiye.

== Aviation accident ==
In the early hours of August 3, 1953, Air France Flight 152 en route Beirut, Lebanon from Rome, Italy made an emergency water landing in the Gulf of Fethiye 2 km (1.2 mi) off the island after losing an engine in-flight. With the help of the keeper Mustafa Pehlivan of the Kızılada Lighthouse, customs officials and fishermen, 38 people of the 8 aircrew and 34 passengers on board of the aircraft of type Lockheed L-749A Constellation survived the accident while four elderly passengers died by drowning. The location of the aircraft's wreck underwater was discovered in February 2018 by the Turkish Navy.

== Forestry ==
Named after its reddish-brown (Turkish: kızıl) appearance, the island was forested again in 2014 with about 5,000 saplings of Turkish pine (Pinus brutia), laurel (Laurus nobilis), carob (Ceratonia siliqua) and Turkish sweetgum (Liquidambar orientalis). After plantation, the saplings were treated with banishing chemicals to protect them from wild goat (Capra aegagrus) and hare (Lepus) living on the island. The forested area makes out around 40% of the island, which is covered by scrub vegetation.
