= Tomb of Hecatomnus =

Tomb in Milas, Muğla Province, Turkey

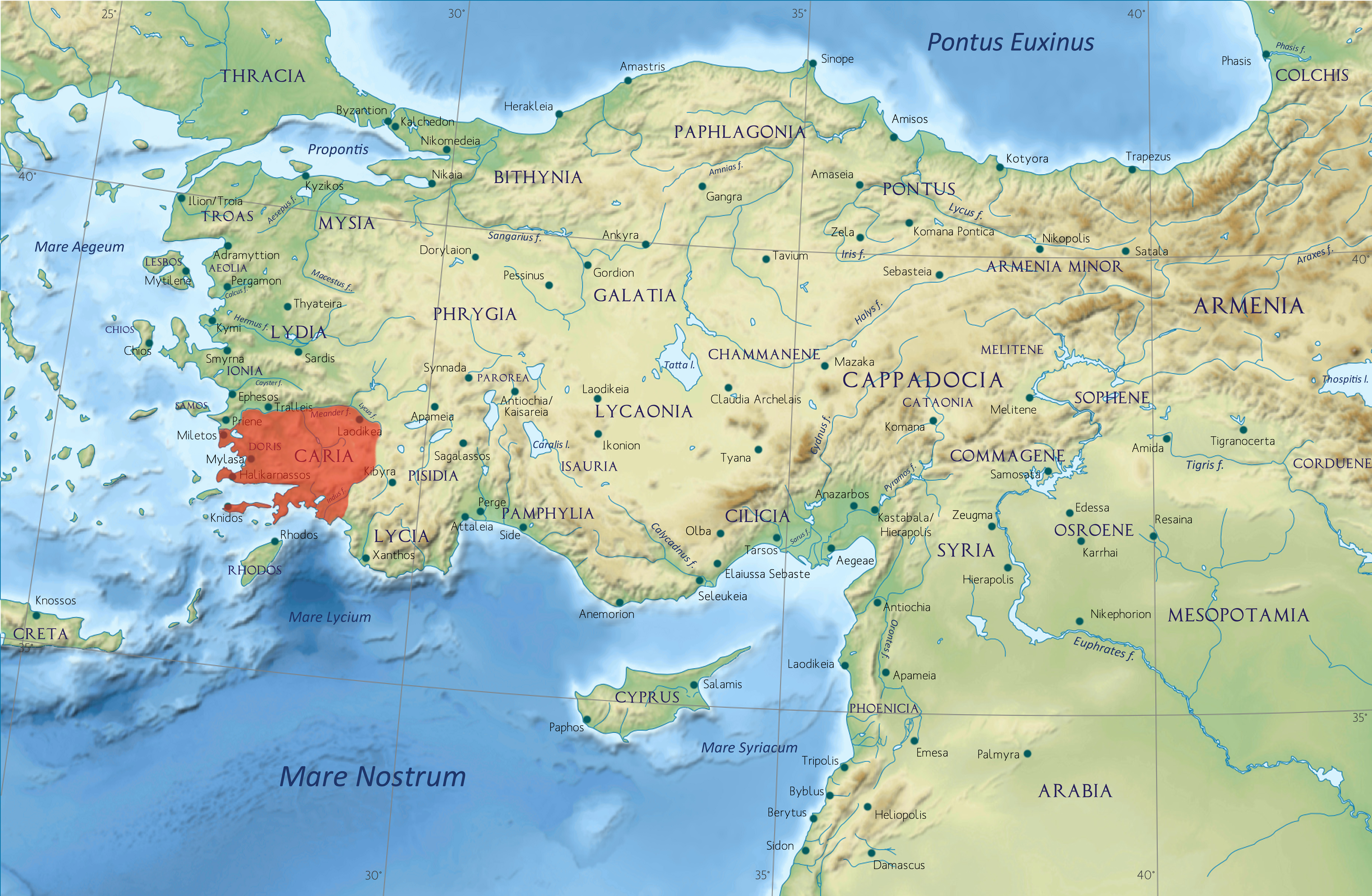
Caria Map Asia Minor

The Tomb of Hecatomnus or Hekatomnos (Greek: Ἑκατόμνος, Carian: 𐊴𐊭𐊪𐊵𐊫 k̂tmno "under-son, descendant(?)") is in the Hisarbaşı District of Milas, one of the most important cities of the Caria region, located in the southwest of Anatolia in present-day Turkey. The tomb was added to the World Heritage Tentative List by UNESCO in 2012.

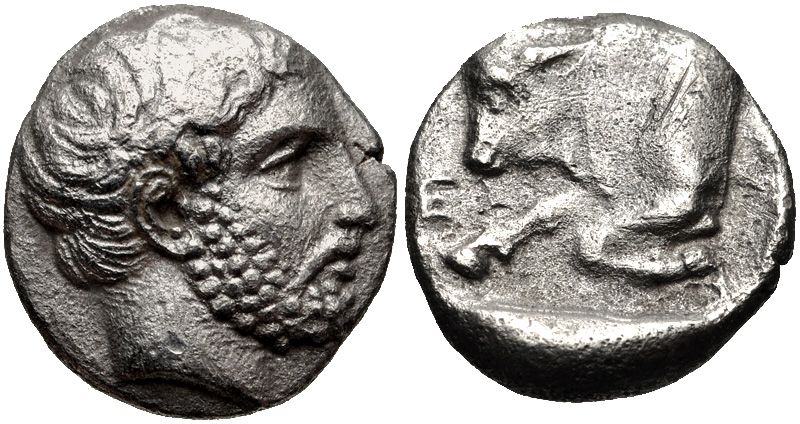
Hecatomnus on a coin

== Biography of Hecatomnus ==
Hecatomnus was the local ruler of the ancient city of Mylasa, which is called Milas in modern days, in region of Caria. Persian King Artaxerxes raised Hecatomnus c. 392 BC to the position of Satrap (provincial governor) of part of the Persian empire. Together with Autophradates, who was the Satrap of Lydia, he was to deal with the rebel leader Euagoras, who was threatening control of Cyprus, but they lost the naval battle. Hecatomnus became ruler of Miletos, one of the largest settlements characterised by Greek culture in Asia Minor. He favoured Greek culture and sent his youngest son to Athens, but preserved the Carian culture in his region. On coins he used images of the Carian cult figure Zeus Labraundos, whose sanctuary was in Labraunda.

Mousolus, the eldest son of Hecatomnus, became satrap of Caria after Hecatomnus died.

== Features of the tomb ==
Hecatomnus' Tomb consists of the Temenos Wall, the Menandros Column (a later structure from the Augustan period), the Podium or base, the surviving chambers of the mausoleum, and the sarcophagus. It was a forerunner of the Mausoleum at Halicarnassus, one of the Seven Wonders of the Ancient World, and is thought to have been conceived, at least partly, by Hecatomnus' son Mausolus.

Hecatomnus' Tomb is one of the most important monuments of antique culture and representing the cult of the dead. It stands at a high level of architectural design, sculpture, and mural painting of the Tomb has a special place in art. The "Friese of Hecatomnus' Tomb" is the only surviving example in classic and Hellenistic Anatolia of such size and quality.

== Looting of the tomb ==
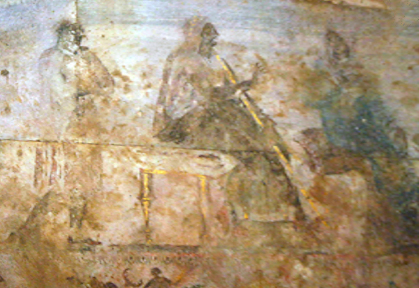
mural painting of the Tomb

In 2010, Turkish authorities witnessed a police operation in which several treasure hunters were arrested. It was at this time that the sarcophagus was discovered. It was found that the illegal treasure hunters had used high-tech drilling machines to drill a hole at least 40–50 cm thick into the marble wall of the tomb. They also used 245 tons of water during the process to cool the machine and let the waste water fill the monumental burial chamber.

After the robbery, Italian, Turkish and Japanese scientists continued to work on the restoration, climate control and documentation of the funerary monument, in order to preserve the remaining cultural assets and identify the stolen artifacts. The crown of Hekatomnos was located in Scotland and was returned to Turkey in 2018, ten years after it was stolen.

== See also ==
- Hecatomnids
