= Air France Flight 152 =

1953 aviation accident

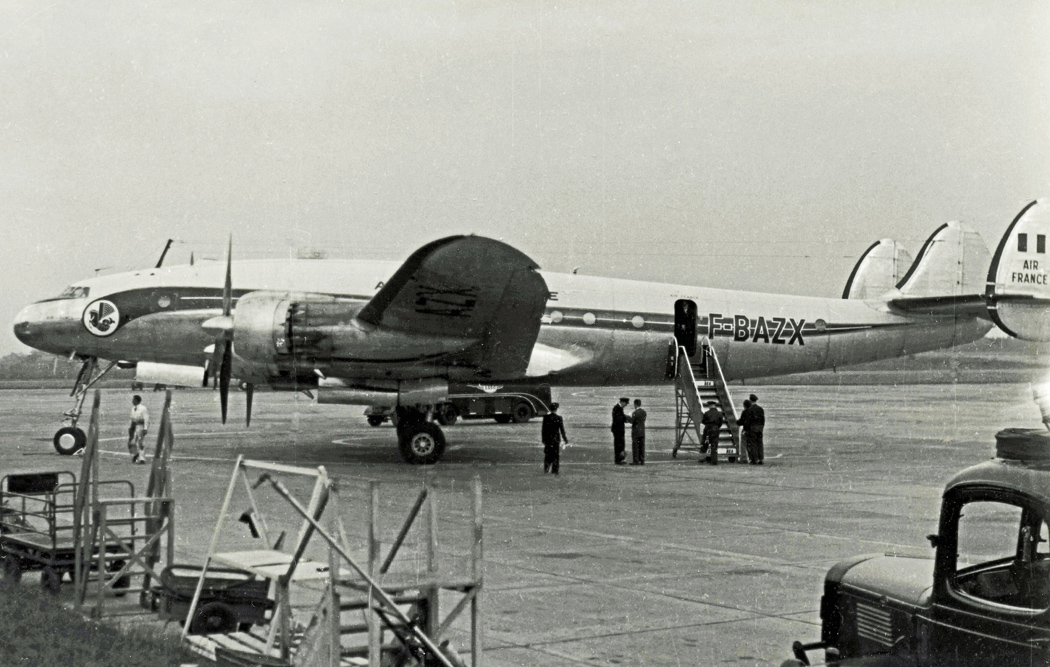
- An Air France Lockheed L-749 Constellation similar to the accident aircraft

Accident
- Date: 3 August 1953
- Summary: Engine detachment, ditching
- Site: Gulf of Fethiye, Turkey Mediterranean Sea; 36.6°N 29.0°E

Aircraft
- Aircraft type: Lockheed L-749A Constellation
- Operator: Air France
- Registration: F-BAZS
- Flight origin: Orly Airport, France
- 1st stopover: Roma-Ciampino Airport, Italy
- 2nd stopover: Beirut International Airport, Lebanon
- Destination: Mehrabad International Airport, Iran
- Occupants: 42
- Passengers: 34
- Crew: 8
- Fatalities: 4
- Survivors: 38

Air France Flight 152 (AF152) was a scheduled international passenger flight which made an emergency water landing in the Mediterranean Sea, off Fethiye, South-Western Turkey on 3 August 1953. The aircraft sank over an hour after ditching. Four passengers died, out of 8 crew and 34 passengers.

The flight originated from Paris and was destined for Tehran, including stopovers in Rome and Beirut, with the accident occurring on the Rome-Beirut leg of the journey. The aircraft serving the flight, a Lockheed L-749A Constellation, likely experienced a propeller blade failure resulting in strong vibrations causing the No. 3 engine to detach in-flight.

== Aircraft and crew ==
The aircraft, Lockheed L-749A Constellation, (F-BAZS c/n 2628), which first flew in 1950, had flown for a total of 10,058 hours and was powered by four Wright R-3350 Duplex-Cyclone radial engines, (type No. 749C18BD1).

The flight was piloted by captain Raymond Terry (born 1923), and first officer Jacques Steens (born 1923). The remaining six crew included radio operator René Debiais, flight engineers Christian Dihau and André Lemaire, and flight attendants Hazera, François Yvon Tinevez and Simone Rospars. Terry had 5,300 flying hours, co-pilot Debiais 5,500 hours and flight attendant Rospars 7,373 hours of flying experience.

== Flight and accident ==
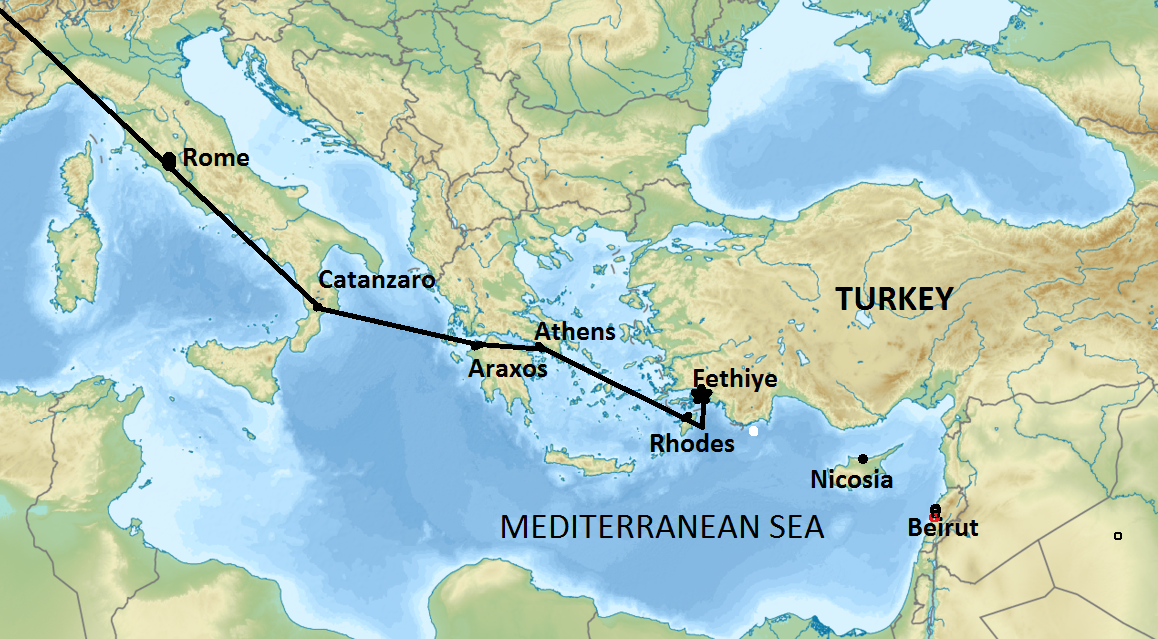
Flight path of AF152 on 2–3 August 1953

The scheduled flight AF152 departed from Orly Airport in Paris, France, at 18:38 hours on 2 August 1953, destination Tehran, with two planned stopovers in Rome, and Beirut. At 21:25 hours, the airliner landed at Roma-Ciampino Airport and took off at 22:32 hours with 34 passengers including an infant on board for the next stopover at Beirut International Airport. The planned flight path was over Catanzaro, Araxos, Athens, Rhodes and Nicosia. The flight time for the leg was calculated as 4 hours and 52 minutes.

At 02:10 hours on 3 August, while cruising at an altitude of 17,500 ft (5,300 m) about 50 mi (80 km) off Rhodes, the No. 3 engine suddenly began to vibrate violently. At 02:15 h, a radio message was sent to Nicosia giving the aircraft's position flying over the coastline of Rhodes. The No. 3 engine soon detached from its mounts, hit and damaged the rear of the fuselage before dropping away. Ongoing vibrations subsequently led to the loss of control on the No. 4 engine. As the aircraft quickly began losing altitude, the flight crew transmitted a three minute long distress signal at 02:22h and decided to make an emergency water landing, avoiding a risky landing in mountainous terrain. They chose a site off the coast of Fethiye in South-Western Turkey after spotting the flashing light of the Kızılada Lighthouse.

During the descent the flight attendants informed the passengers about the situation, calmed them down and instructed them to put on life jackets. At 02:28, the aircraft ditched into the calm sea flawlessly, about 2 km (1.2 mi) off Kızılada in the Gulf of Fethiye approximately 10 km (6.2 mi) from Fethiye. The passengers and the crew promptly evacuated the airplane using the four emergency exits, and initially remained on the wings of the floating aircraft for over an hour until it sank.

== Rescue ==
Lighthouse keeper Ahmet Pehlivan noticed the airliner's ditching, however, neither he nor his supervisor could sight it in the pitch-dark night. Only sometime later, with the beginning of twilight, could they see the aircraft and the victims on the sea surface. They rushed to the accident site by boat, rescuing some passengers, including flight attendant Rospars, who held a five-month old infant girl named Roxane on her lap, and the baby's mother, to the island shore. Meanwhile, crew members and some passengers tried to swim the distance to the island in order to call for relief. Alerted by the lighthouse keeper, customs officers and fishermen sailed towards the scene, picking survivors on the water.

Four elderly passengers of the 42 people on board of the airliner died by drowning. The survivors received clothing, warm food, drink and shelter from residents during their stay in Fethiye.

== Aftermath ==
At 04:30 the same day, Beirut alerted Air France by telegram of Flight 152's failure to arrive, and asked for a search and rescue operation. At 10:30 the stopover office of Air France in Athens asked Orly Airport for news about F-BAZS. At 17:30 hours, a telegram from the airliner's captain, sent from Fethiye, arrived at Air France stating that 38 people survived the accident.

After being informed of the accident, seven officials of the French aviation accident investigation agency Bureau d'Enquêtes et d'Analyses pour la Sécurité de l'Aviation Civile arrived at the accident site the next day at 17:00. The investigation lasted almost eight months; the final report was released on 16 March 1954, stating the cause of the accident as "the failure of a propeller blade resulting in the separation of the No. 3 engine from the aircraft, and loss of control of the No. 4 engine. The cause of the propeller blade fracture could not be determined." Didier Daurat, Director of Orly Operations Centre, was tasked with shedding light on the cause of propeller blade's failure.

The crew, the passengers and the investigators were transported to Rhodes, from where they were flown to Paris four days after the accident.

As a consequence of the accident, it was made obligatory to carry liferafts on all flights.

== In media ==
In 2013, 60 years after the accident, an underwater search operation was undertaken in the Gulf of Fethiye, which led to finding of an aircraft engine, but not the airliner itself. A documentary film about this search was aired by İZ TV.

The wreckage of the aircraft was discovered by the Turkish Navy in 2018.
