= Kızılada Lighthouse =

Kızılada Lighthouse Kızılada Feneri
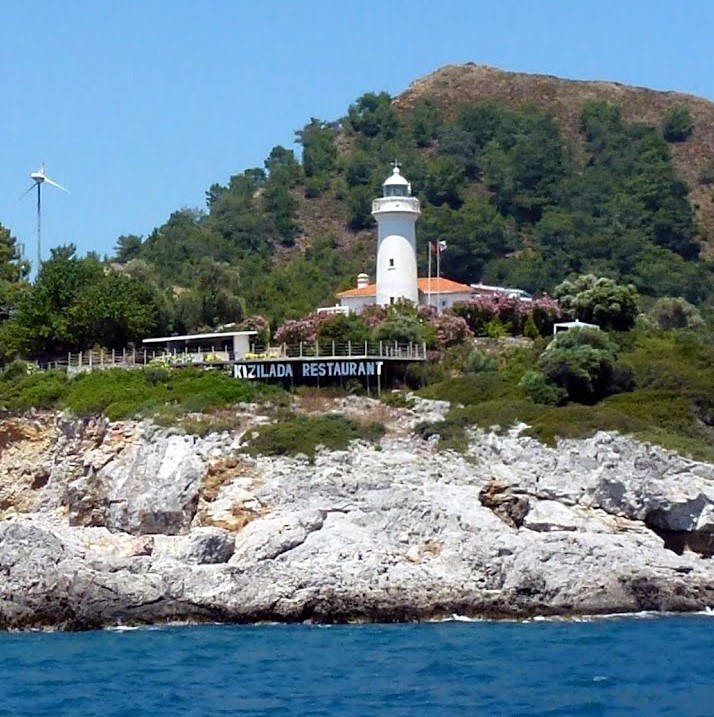
- Kızılada Feneri in 2012
- Location: Kızılada, Fethiye; Muğla Province, Turkey
- Coordinates: 36°39′10.7″N 29°02′38.7″E

Tower
- Constructed: 1910; 116 years ago
- Construction: Masonry tower
- Height: 13 m (43 ft)
- Shape: Cylindrical tower with balcony and lantern
- Markings: White tower

Light
- Focal height: 32 m (105 ft)
- Range: 15 nmi (28 km)
- Characteristic: Fl W 5s

The Kızılada Lighthouse (Turkish: Kızılada Feneri) is a historical lighthouse still in use, which is located on the island Kızılada in the Gulf of Fethiye, southwestern Turkey. (Note: The "Turkish phrase for a lighthouse is fener (plural fenerler) or deniz feneri ('sea lantern').")

== History ==
The masonry lighthouse was constructed in 1910 by Frenchmen on the southern point of the island. The 13 m (43 ft)-tall lighthouse tower with a gallery around the lantern room has the form of a cylinder and is white painted. A one-story keeper's house is attached to it. At a focal height of 32 m (105 ft), it flashes white every 5 seconds, which is visible at a range of 15 nmi (28 km). It is also equıipped with racon device. Operated and maintained by the Coastal Safety Authority (Turkish: Kıyı Emniyeti Genel Müdürlüğü) of the Ministry of Transport and Communication, it is listed in Turkey under the code "TUR-037" and registered internationally under E5841. The lighthouse was renovated in 2007, and is powered by a wind turbine. It is floodlit at night.

In 2007, the lighthouse was opened to tourism pursuant to a 49-year lease to the Kizilada Tourism Corporation. A seafood restaurant was opened next to the lighthouse in 2007, and the next year a hostel with nine rooms was added.

In 2008, a 31.47-gram silver coin was minted with the lighthouse's profile.

== Aviation accident ==
A Lockheed L-749A Constellation aircraft operated by Air France on the flight AF152 en route from Rome, Italy to Beirut, Lebanon ditched 10 km (6.2 mi) off the coast of Fethiye, about 2 km (1.2 mi) off the island Kızılada after midnight on August 3, 1953. The cause of the accident was a propeller failure. The lighthouse keeper Mustafa Pehlivan rushed to the accident site by boat and rescued some survivors. He also alerted customs officials and fishermen who helped in the rescue. Of the 8 aircrew and 34 passengers on board, 38 survived the accident while four passengers drowned. The location of the aircraft's wreck underwater is still unknown.

== See also ==
- List of lighthouses in Turkey
