= Telmessos =

Ancient city in Lycia

- Location within Turkey Location within Near East Location within Eastern Mediterranean
- 36°37′6″N 29°7′4″E
- Location: Fethiye, Muğla Province, Turkey

History
- Built: Pre-10th millennium BCE

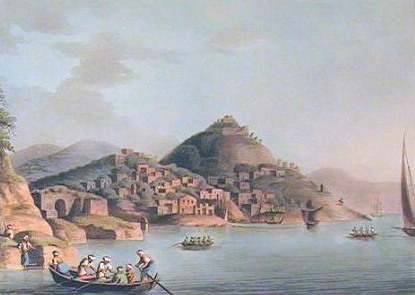
Painting of Telmessos by Luigi Mayer

Telmessos or Telmessus (Hittite: 𒆳𒌷𒆪𒉿𒆷𒉺𒀸𒊭, romanized: Kuwalapašša; Lycian: 𐊗𐊁𐊍𐊁𐊂𐊁𐊛𐊆, romanized: Telebehi; Ancient Greek: Τελμησσός), also Telmissus (Ancient Greek: Τελμισσός), later Anastasiopolis (Ancient Greek: Αναστασιούπολις), then Makri or Macre (Greek: Μάκρη), was the largest city in Lycia, near the Carian border, and is sometimes confused with Telmessos in Caria. It was called Telebehi in the Lycian language. The well-protected harbor of Telmessos is separated from the Gulf of Telmessos by an island.

The name of the modern town on the site is Fethiye.

== History ==
=== Late Bronze Age ===
The Hittite name was Kuwalapašša, while the Lycian name was Telebehi.

In the 13th century BC, the Annals of Hattusili III mentions the city as a part of Lukka (Lycia) and conquered by the Hittites. Another Hittite document mentions the cities of Kuwalapašša and Dalawa sent aid to Hittites during the war against Iyalanda.

=== Iron Age ===
Telmessos was a flourishing city in the west of Lycia, on the Gulf of Fethiye. It was famed for its school of diviners, consulted among others by the Lydian king Croesus, prior to declaring war against Cyrus.

Telmessos was a member of the Delian League in the 5th century BC. It was taken by Alexander the Great in 334 BC, when he came to the town after the siege of Halicarnassus.

=== Middle Ages ===
Telmessos was renamed Anastasiopolis in the 8th century AD, apparently in honour of Emperor Anastasios II, but this name did not persist. The city came to be called Makri, after the name of the island at the entrance to the harbor. This name is attested for the first time in 879 AD.

However, an inscription of the 7th century found in Gibraltar and bearing the ethnonym "Makriotes" (from Makri) may indicate an earlier existence of name Makri.

Its ruins are located at Fethiye.

== Church history ==
Le Quien (Oriens christianus, I, 971) mentions two bishops of Telmessus: Hilary (370) and Zenodotus, at the Council of Chalcedon (451). The latter is called "Bishop of the Metropolis of Telmessaei and the Isle of Macra". The Notitiae Episcopatuum mentions Telmessus among the suffragans of Myra until the 10th century, when it is no longer called Macra; in 1316 mention is made of the See of "Macra and Lybysium". Lybysium or Levissi, about four miles south-west of Makri, had in the early 20th century 3000 inhabitants, nearly all Greeks.

The see is included, under the name Telmissus, in the Catholic Church's list of titular sees. The historically important former Bishop of Montreal, Ignace Bourget's first episcopal title was as bishop of the Catholic titular see of Telmessos. In the Eastern Orthodox Church, Telmessos is also a titular episcopal see of the Ecumenical Patriarchate of Constantinople. The current holder of the see, Archbishop Job, is primate of the Patriarchal Exarchate for Orthodox Parishes of Russian Tradition in Western Europe, based in Paris.

== See also ==
- Aristander of Telmessus, seer to Alexander the Great
- Birds Without Wings 2004 novel by Louis de Bernières set in the early 1900s in a fictional Anatolian village called Eskibahçe where Telmessos is the nearest town.
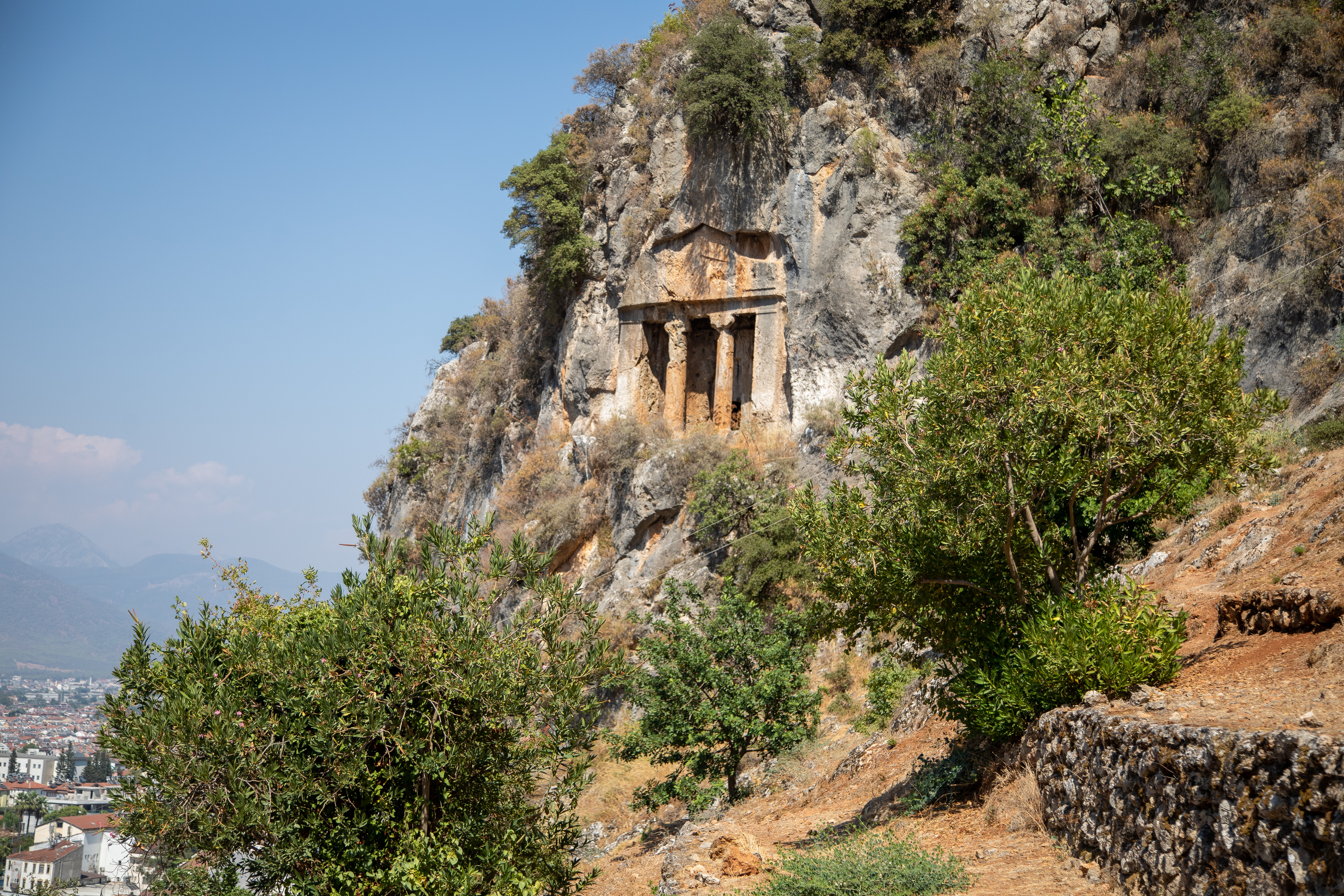

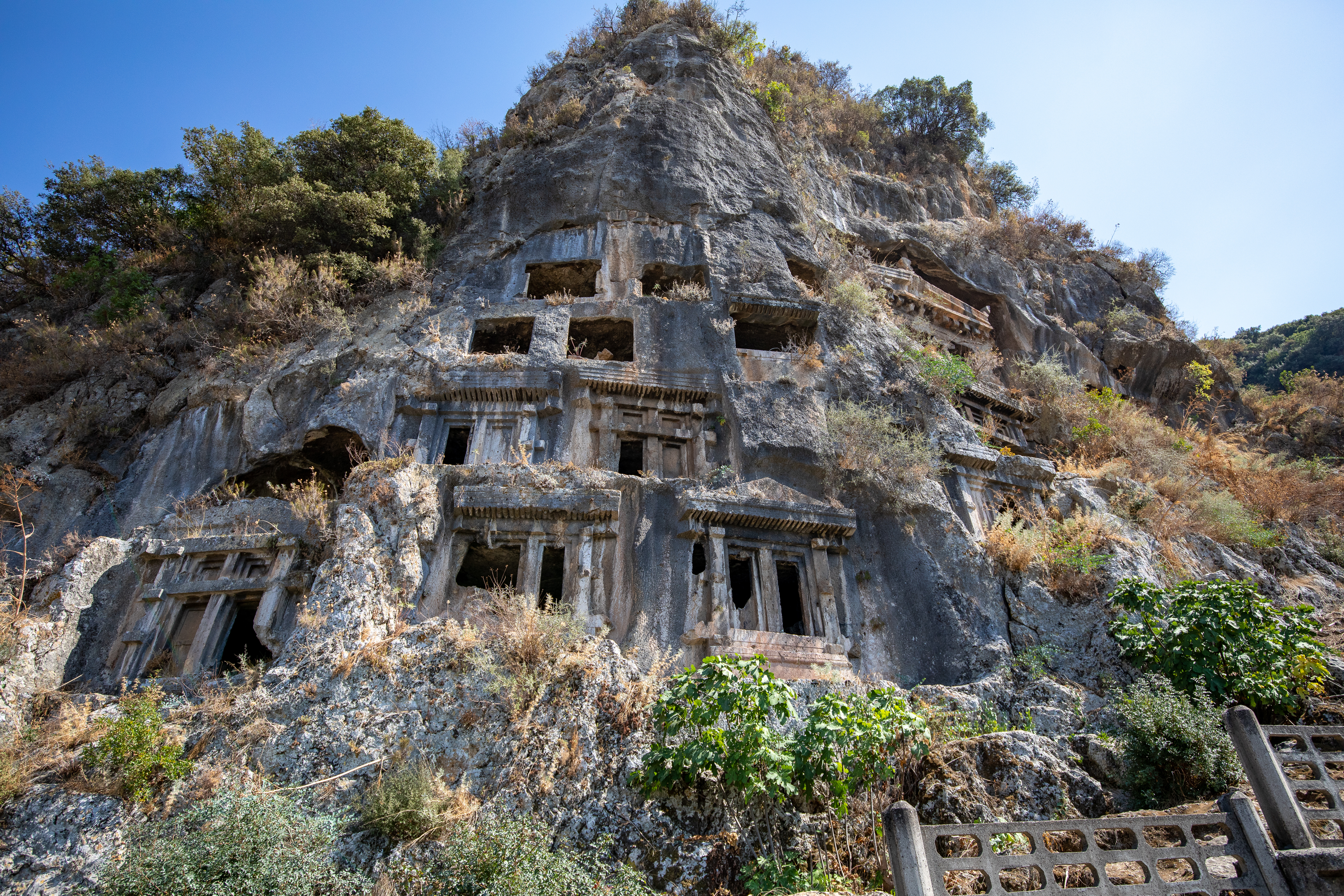

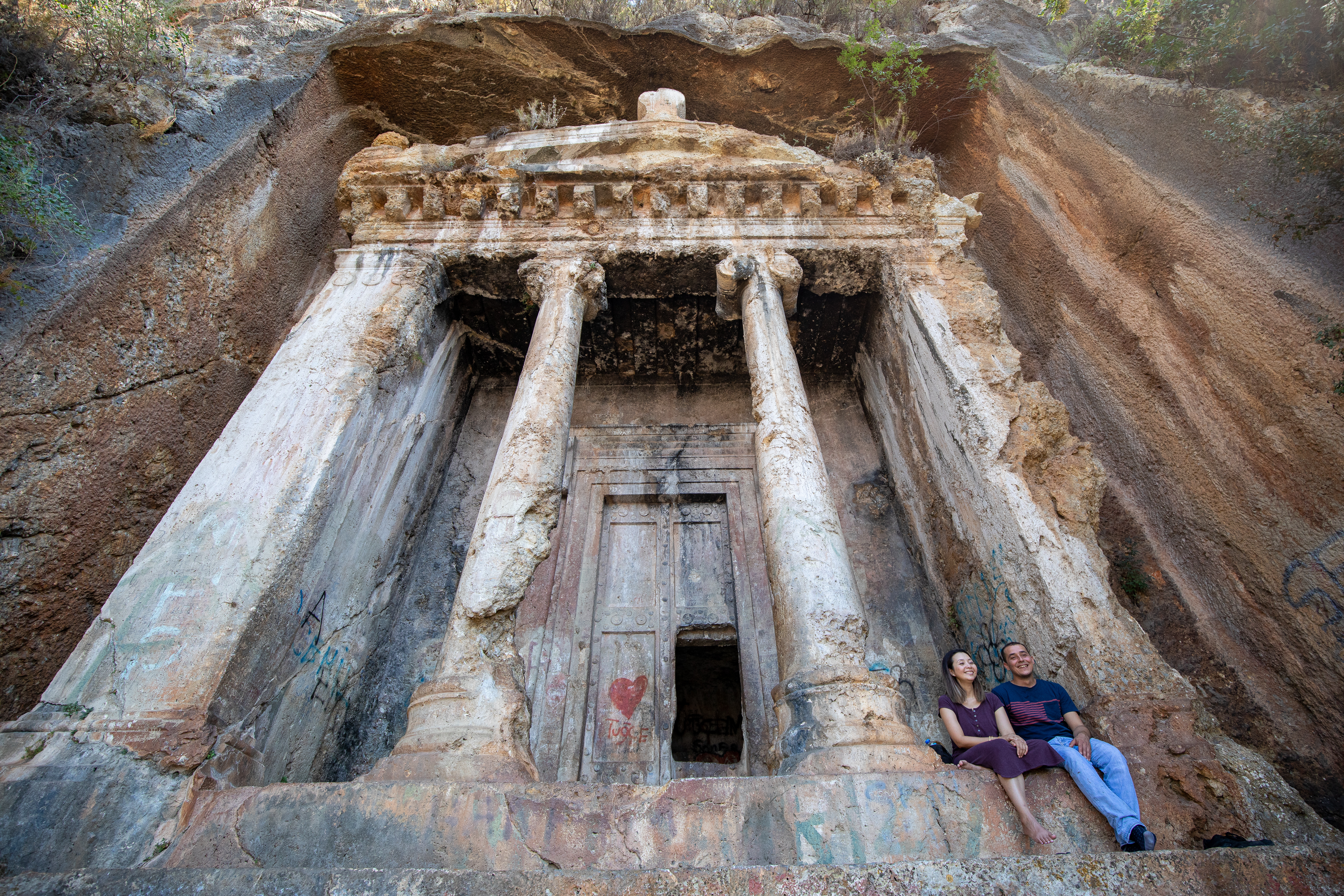

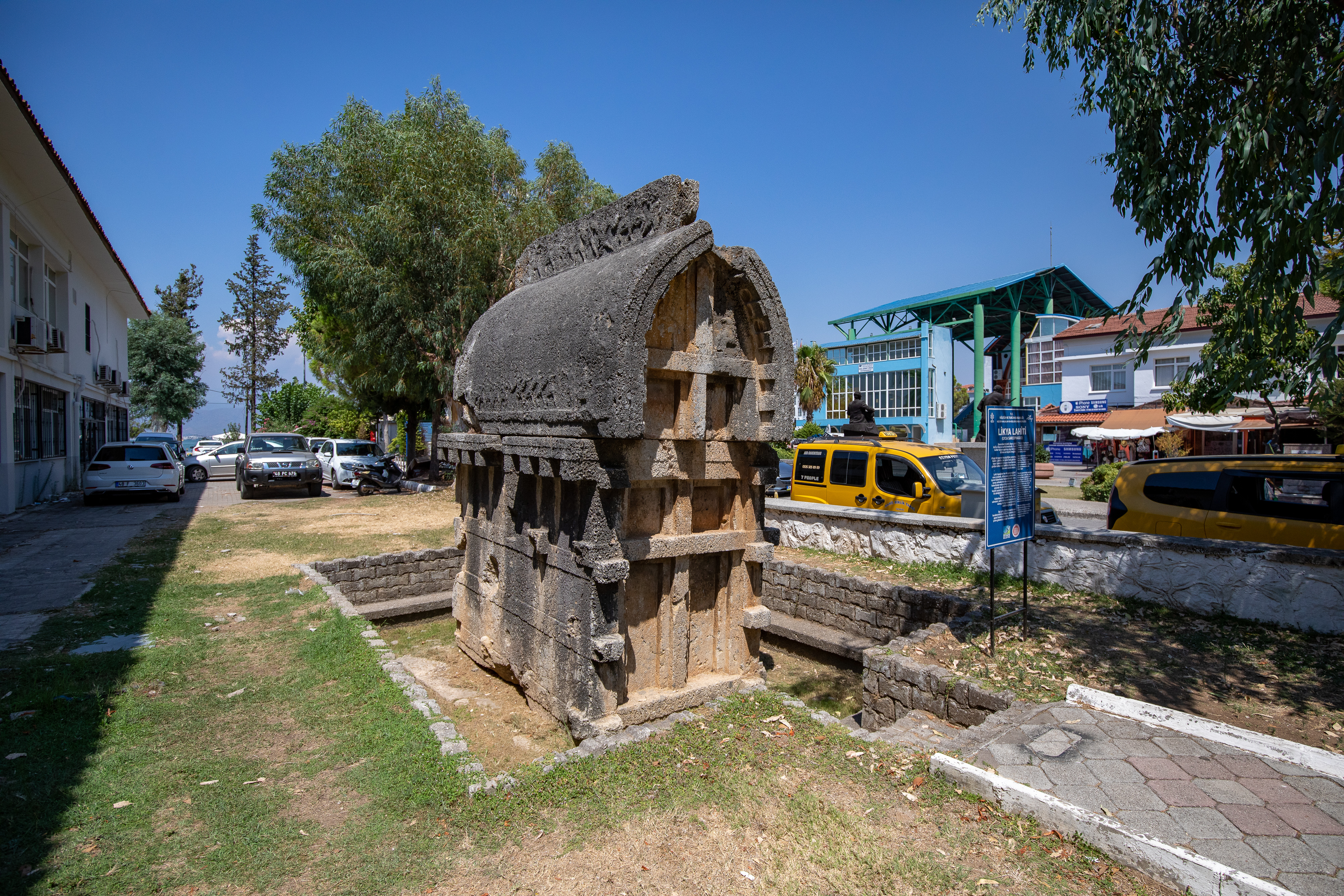

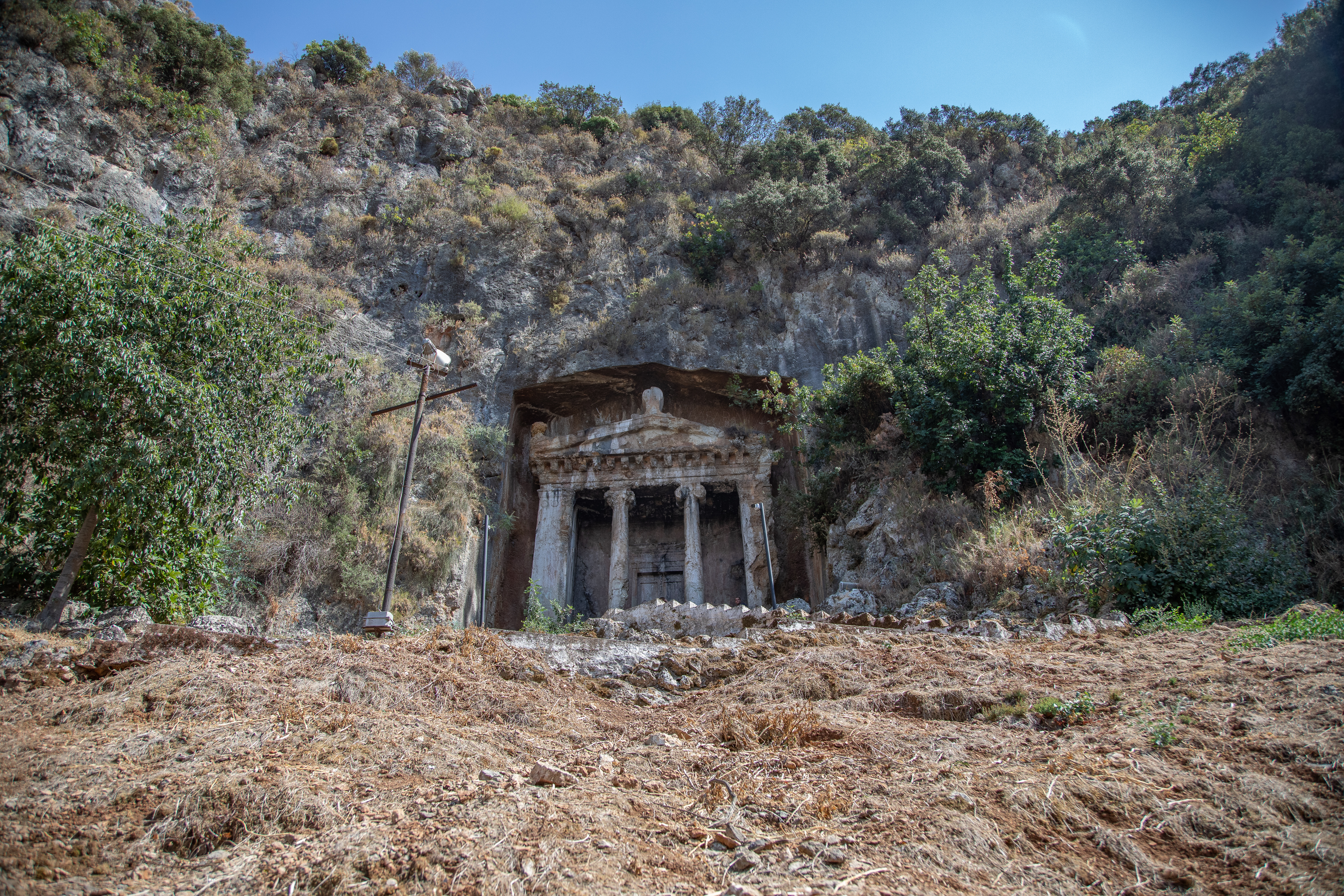

== Sources ==
- Herbermann, Charles, ed. (1913). "Telmessus". Catholic Encyclopedia. New York: Robert Appleton Company.
- Archaeological World
- Clive Foss, "The Lycian Coast in the Byzantine Age", Dumbarton Oaks Papers 48:1-52 (1994). at JSTOR
