= On the Liberty of the Rhodians =

Oration by Demosthenes

"On the Liberty of the Rhodians" (Ancient Greek: Ὑπὲρ τῆς Ροδίων ἐλευθερίας) is one of the first political orations of the prominent Athenian statesman and orator Demosthenes. It is generally dated to 351/0 BC, shortly after the First Philippic, and constitutes one of the initial political interventions of Demosthenes.

The island of Rhodes had been part of the Second Athenian League, but in 357 it was one of the states which rebelled against Athens in the Social War, and gained independence from Athens. The oligarchic faction of Rhodes came into power, with the help of support from Mausolus of Halicarnassus. The democratic faction correspondingly asked for Athenian support, and Demosthenes' speech was composed for the debate in the Assembly about whether to give them help. "On the Liberty of the Rhodians" makes the case for Athenian intervention in Rhodes, though makes no specific proposals as to what form that support might take – other speakers in favour of intervention were presumably expected to make such proposals, and Demosthenes' speech would have been to support those. Athens in the end did not intervene in Rhodes.
