= Kapıdağ Peninsula (Muğla Province) =

Native name: Kapıdağ Yarımadası
- Interactive map of Kapıdağ Peninsula

Geography
- Location: Mediterranean Sea
- Coordinates: 36.621161°N 28.854791°E

Administration
- Turkey
- Region: Mediterranean
- Provinces: Muğla

Kapıdağ Peninsula (Turkish: Kapıdağ Yarımadası) is a peninsula in southwestern Anatolia extending into the Mediterranean Sea in Muğla Province, Turkey, terminating in Cape Kurdoğlu. The peninsula forms the Gulf of Fethiye on its east. The peninsula was the site of the ancient town of Lydae.
