= Lydae =

Town of ancient Caria or Lycia

Coordinates: 36°37′18″N 28°51′33″E

Lydae or Lydai (Ancient Greek: Λύδαι) was a town of ancient Caria or Lycia in the Rhodian Peraea. Ptolemy notes the city in Lycia under the name Chydae. The Stadiasmus Maris Magni calls the city Clydae or Klydai (Κλυδαί) and places it in Caria.

The family of Gaius Iulius Heliodoros from Lydae, which produced Lycian Federal Priests, an archiphylax, and a Roman Senator, is well-documented. The demoi (subordinate urban units) of Lydae, Arymaxa and Kreneis are known in Roman imperial times; they used to be separate communities that merged with Lydae via sympoliteia.

Its site is located on the modern Kapıdağ Peninsula. There are extensive Roman and Byzantine ruins. These include a theatre and an agora. Numerous tombs and mausoleums are scattered across the ruins.

The site was identified by the British antiquaries Theodore and Mabel Bent in March 1888.
