= Archiphylax =

The Archiphylax was an official of the Lycian League who was charged with collecting the taxes that the Lycians were required to pay to Rome.

The Lycian League guaranteed Rome that their taxes would be paid in full and on time and so the Archiphylax was entrusted with this responsibility. He may choose to pay out of his own pocket as an advance and collect the taxes from the individual cities as a reimbursement. If a city did not pay him the full amount owed it resulted in a financial loss to the Archiphylax which made the job a large financial burden. He was expected to collect the taxes peacefully.

The post of Archiphylax was often held by young men from aristocratic families and was often considered the first step in a political career. There are some recorded cases of a father holding this position on behalf of his young son. the Archiphylax was also charged with maintaining “Peace and order” which suggests that his office saw him as the head of a police force as well as being given certain tasks by the governor. He may also have a subordinate federal official known as a Hypophylax who assisted him in his role as keeper of the peace.
