= Labraunda =

Ancient city in Turkey

- Λάβρανδα (Ancient Greek)
- Labranda
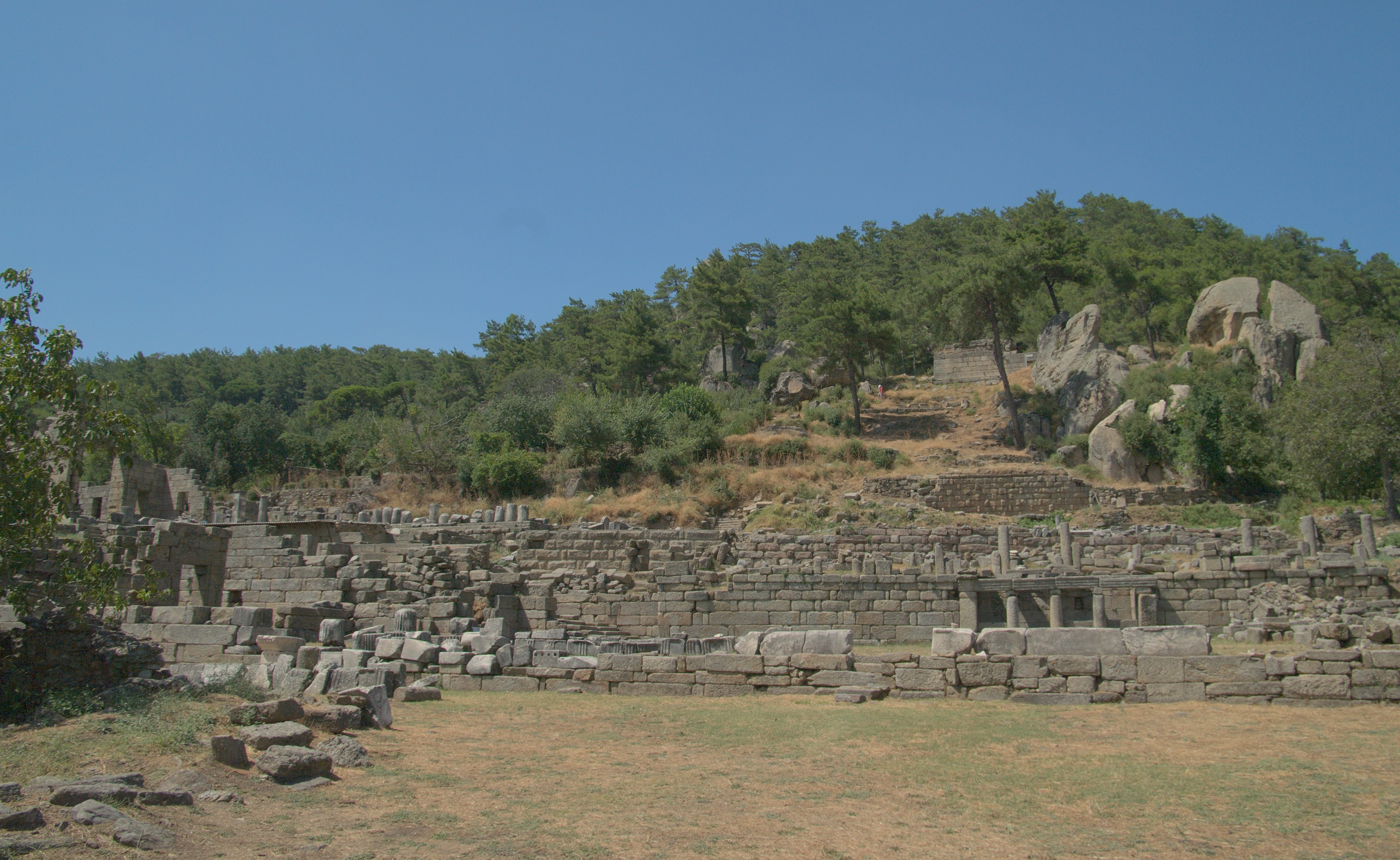
- Labraunda was built on artificial terraces

- Location within Turkey
- 37°25′8″N 27°49′13″E
- Type: Sanctuary
- Satellite of: Mylasa
- Location: Ortaköy, Muğla Province, Turkey
- Region: Caria

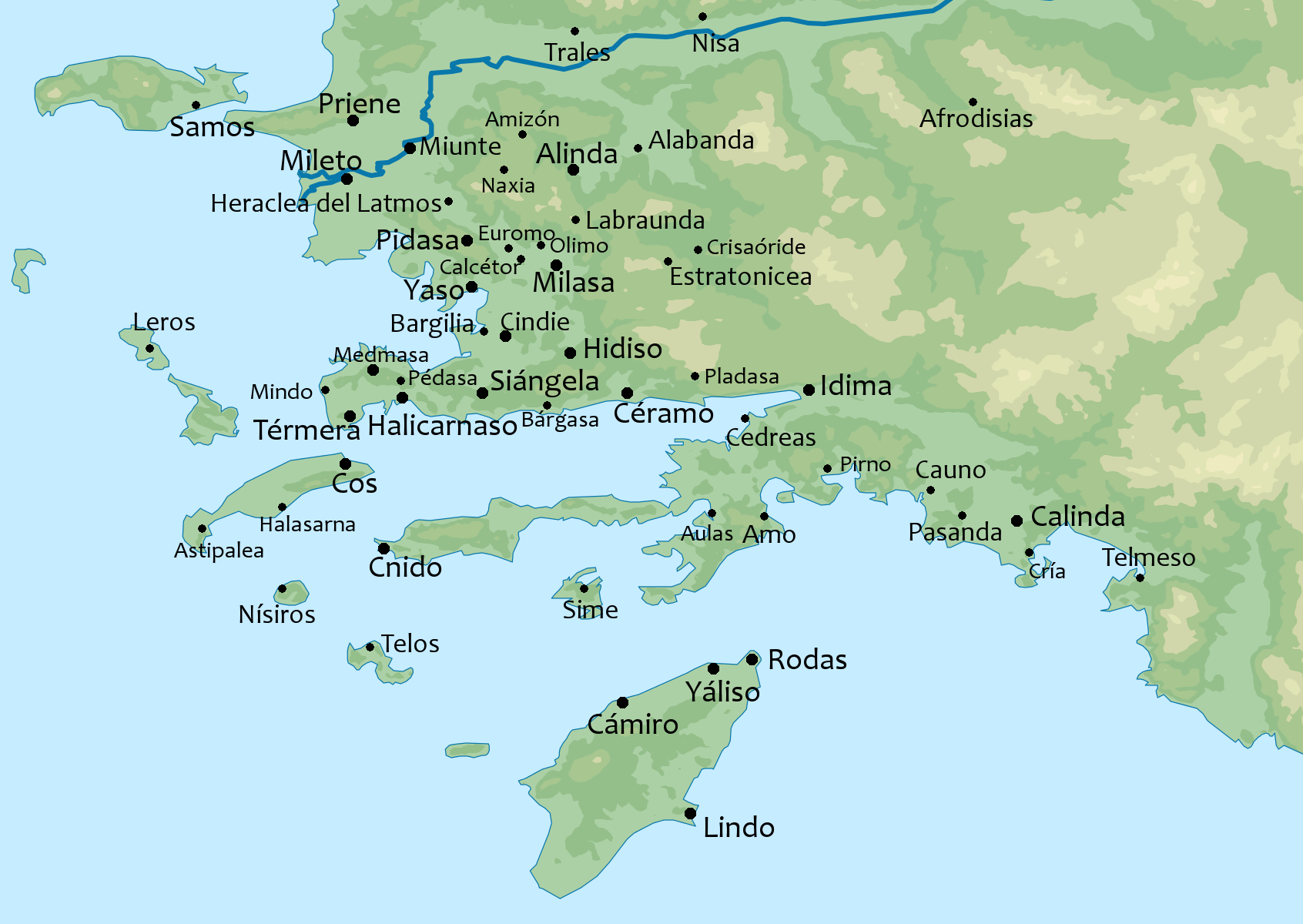
Ancient cities of Caria

Labraunda (Ancient Greek: Λάβρανδα Labranda or Λάβραυνδα Labraunda) is an ancient archaeological site five kilometers west of Ortaköy, Muğla Province, Turkey, in the mountains near the coast of Caria. In ancient times, it was held sacred by Carians and Mysians alike. The site amid its sacred plane trees was enriched in the Hellenistic style by the Hecatomnid dynasty of Mausolus, satrap (and virtual king) of Persian Caria (c. 377 – 352 BCE), and also later by his successor and brother Idrieus; Labranda was the dynasty's ancestral sacred shrine. The prosperity of a rapidly hellenised Caria occurred during the 4th century BCE. Remains of Hellenistic houses and streets can still be traced, and there are numerous inscriptions.

The cult icon here was a local Zeus Labrandeus (Ζεὺς Λαβρανδεύς), a standing Zeus with the tall lotus-tipped scepter upright in his left hand and the double-headed axe, the labrys, in his right hand. The cult statue was the gift of the founder of the dynasty, Hecatomnus himself, recorded in a surviving inscription.

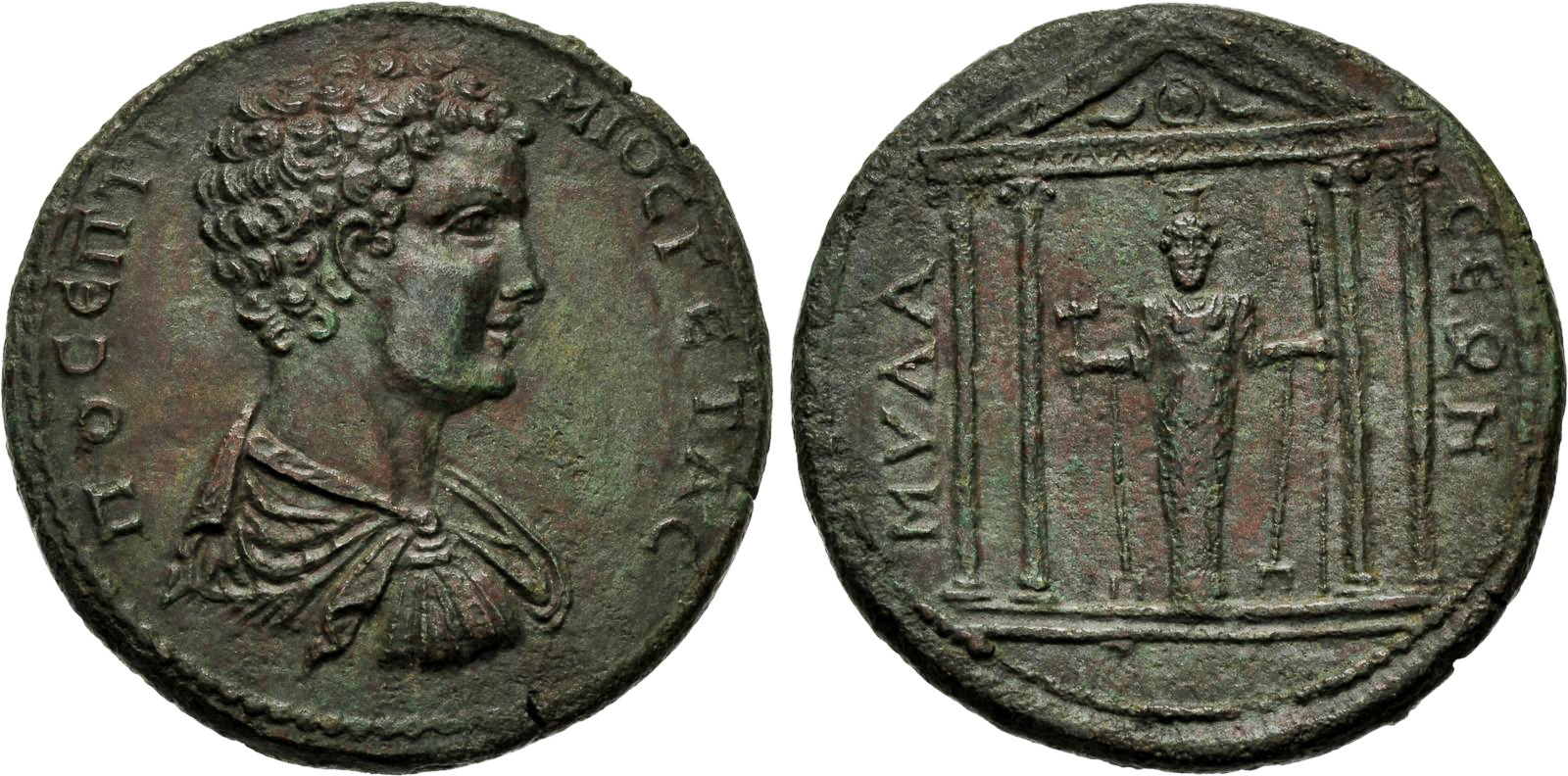
Zeus Labraundos Temple on a Roman coin of emperor Geta from Mylasa

In the 3rd century BCE, with the fall of the Hecatomnids, Labraunda passed into the control of Mylasa. The site was later occupied without discontinuity until the mid Byzantine period.

== Labraunda and labrys ==
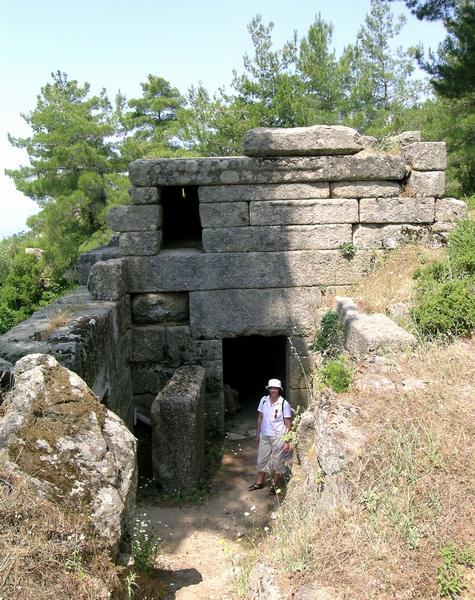
Tomb of 4th century BCE wrongly attributed to Carian Dynast Idrieus in Labraunda

The first occurrence of "labrys" in English (1901) noted by the OED concerns this sanctuary:

It seems natural to interpret names of Carian sanctuaries like Labranda in the most literal sense as the place of the sacred labrys, which was the Lydian (or Carian) name for the Greek πέλεκυς, or double-edged axe.

The same root labr- appears in the labyrinth of Knossos, which is interpreted as the "place of the axe." The double-headed axe was a central iconic motif at Labraunda. The axe cast of gold had been kept in the Lydian capital Sardes for centuries. The Lydian king Gyges awarded it to the Carians, to commemorate Carian support in a battle. This is the mythic anecdote: the social and political reality may have been more complicated, for such ritual objects are never lightly passed from hand to hand or moved from their fixed abode. Upon receiving this precious, purely ritual axe, the Carians kept it in the Temple of Zeus at Labraunda.

The figure of a double-sided axe is a feature of many coins of Halicarnassus. Coins at the museum at Bodrum bear the head of Apollo on the obverse and on the reverse the name of the reigning Carian ruler inscribed next to the figure of Zeus Labraunda carrying the double-bladed Carian axe.

== Site ==
The Swedish Institute at Athens has been in charge of archeology at Labraunda, notably in a series of campaigns in 1948-53, initiated by Axel W. Persson and taken up, after the latter's sudden death, by Gösta Säflund, has published its findings in a long series, grouped as four volumes, from 1955 onwards. Reports documenting the archaeological fieldwork have been published in the Opuscula. Annual of the Swedish Institutes at Athens and Rome.

The hieron, one of the best-preserved and most complete series of 4th century BCE structures, contained a series of buildings of unusual construction, ranged on several formal terraces. In its synthesis of Achaemenid and Ionian features it foreshadowed Hellenistic style.

The sacred precinct was entered through one of two marble Ionic propylea at the southeast corner of the site. The Ionic temple of Zeus bore a dedicatory inscription of the brother of Mausolus, Idrieus (351-44 BCE); it had a simplified, two-part architrave, and a low ceiling to the small cella.

As of 2018, the site was being excavated by an international team led by archaeologists Olivier Henry and Ömür Dünya Çakmaklı.

== Bibliography ==
- Karlsson, Lars; Carlsson, Susanne, eds. (2011). Labraunda & Karia. Proceedings of the International Symposium Commemorating Sixty Years of Swedish Archaeological Work in Labraunda. The Royal Swedish Academy of Letters, History and Antiquities, Stockholm, November 20-21, 2008. Acta Universitatis Upsaliensis: Boreas. Uppsala Studies in Ancient Mediterranean and Near Eastern Civilizations. Vol. 32. Uppsala: Uppsala Universitet. ISBN 978-91-554-7997-8.
