= Telmessos (Caria) =

Town of ancient Caria

Coordinates: 37°02′23″N 27°19′04″E

Telmessos or Telmessus (Ancient Greek: Τελμησσός or Τελμισσός), was a town in ancient Caria.

Its site is tentatively located at the remains near Görece in western Anatolia. There was a shrine dedicated to the nymph Daphne in Telmessos.
