= Gulf of Fethiye =

Bay in Turkey

Coordinates: 36°38′N 28°58′E

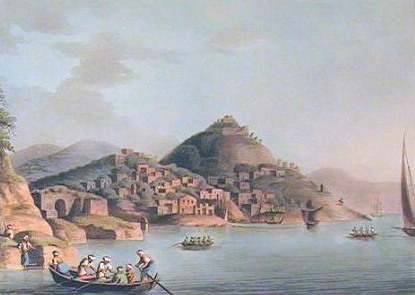
Gulf of Thermessos, painting by Luigi Mayer.

The Gulf of Fethiye (Turkish: Fethiye Körfezi) is a branch of the Mediterranean Sea in southwestern Turkey. The cities Fethiye and Göcek of Muğla Province are situated around the gulf. It is bounded on the west by Cape Kurdoğlu (Turkish: Kurtoğlu Burnu) and on the east by Cape İblis/Cape Angistro (Turkish: İblis Burnu). It is a popular area for tourism and yachting. Until 1923, it was known as the Gulf of Meğri/Makri/Macre/Mekri, the former Greek-origin name of Fethiye.

It is located in ancient Lycia, and was known as the Gulf of Telmessos or the Glaucus Sinus (presumably for Glaucus, son of Hippolochus). The ancient cities of Lydae and Telmessos (modern Fethiye) lay on it.
