= Hymessos =

Town of ancient Caria

Hymessos (Ancient Greek: Ὑμεσσος) or Hymissos (Ὑμισσος) was a town of ancient Caria. It was a polis (city-state) and a member of the Delian League.

Its site is unlocated, but it is suggested to be near Mylasa.
