= Passala =

Town of ancient Caria

Coordinates: 37°15′01″N 27°38′59″E

Passala (Ancient Greek: Πάσσαλα) was a town of ancient Caria. Stephanus of Byzantium wrote that it belonged to the city of Milas.

Its site is located near Sakız, Asiatic Turkey.
