= Amateau =

Amateau is a surname. Notable people with the surname include:

- Albert Jean Amateau (1889–1996), Turkish rabbi, businessman, lawyer, and social activist
- Rod Amateau (1923–2003), American film and television screenwriter, director, and producer
