= Gümüşlük, Milas =

Village in Turkey

Gümüşlük
- Neighbourhood
- Location in Turkey Gümüşlük (Turkey Aegean)
- Coordinates: 37°19′36″N 27°45′18″E
- Country: Turkey
- Province: Muğla
- District: Milas
- Population (2024): 4,598
- Time zone: UTC+3 (TRT)

Gümüşlük is a neighbourhood in the municipality and district of Milas, Muğla Province, Turkey. Its population is 4,598 (2024).
