= Bayırköy, Milas =

Village in Turkey

Bayırköy
- Neighbourhood
- Coordinates
- Country: Turkey
- Province: Muğla
- District: Milas
- Population (2024): 346
- Time zone: UTC+3 (TRT)

Bayırköy is a neighbourhood in the municipality and district of Milas, Muğla Province, Turkey. Its population is 346 (2024).
