= Hayıtlı-Ahmet Çavuş, Milas =

Village in Turkey

Hayıtlı-Ahmet Çavuş
- Neighbourhood
- Location in Turkey Hayıtlı-Ahmet Çavuş (Turkey Aegean)
- Coordinates: 37°18′36″N 27°47′22″E
- Country: Turkey
- Province: Muğla
- District: Milas
- Population (2024): 8,536
- Time zone: UTC+3 (TRT)

Hayıtlı-Ahmet Çavuş (also: Ahmetçavuş-Hayıtlı) is a neighbourhood in the municipality and district of Milas, Muğla Province, Turkey. Its population is 8,536 (2024).
