= Gazi-Firuz Paşa, Milas =

Village in Turkey

Gazi-Firuz Paşa
- Neighbourhood
- Location in Turkey Gazi-Firuz Paşa (Turkey Aegean)
- Coordinates: 37°19′04″N 27°46′55″E
- Country: Turkey
- Province: Muğla
- District: Milas
- Population (2024): 1,049
- Time zone: UTC+3 (TRT)

Gazi-Firuz Paşa (also: Firuzpaşa-Gazipaşa) is a neighbourhood in the municipality and district of Milas, Muğla Province, Turkey. Its population is 1,049 (2024).
