= Cumhuriyet, Milas =

Village in Turkey

Cumhuriyet
- Neighbourhood
- Location in Turkey Cumhuriyet (Turkey Aegean)
- Coordinates: 37°18′02″N 27°47′04″E
- Country: Turkey
- Province: Muğla
- District: Milas
- Population (2024): 10,250
- Time zone: UTC+3 (TRT)

Cumhuriyet is a neighbourhood in the municipality and district of Milas, Muğla Province, Turkey. Its population is 10,250 (2024).
