= Bozbük, Milas =

Village in Turkey

Bozbük
- Neighbourhood
- Location in Turkey Bozbük (Turkey Aegean)
- Coordinates: 37°21′27″N 27°26′31″E
- Country: Turkey
- Province: Muğla
- District: Milas
- Population (2024): 678
- Time zone: UTC+3 (TRT)

Bozbük is a neighbourhood in the municipality and district of Milas, Muğla Province, Turkey. Its population is 678 (2024).
