= Akçakaya, Milas =

Village in Turkey

Akçakaya
- Neighbourhood
- Location in Turkey Akçakaya (Turkey Aegean)
- Coordinates: 37°4′N 27°51′E
- Country: Turkey
- Province: Muğla
- District: Milas
- Population (2000): 294
- Time zone: UTC+3 (TRT)

Akçakaya is a neighbourhood in the municipality and district of Milas, Muğla Province, Turkey. Its population was 294 in 2000.
