= Aydınlıkevler, Milas =

Village in Turkey

Aydınlıkevler
- Neighbourhood
- Location in Turkey Aydınlıkevler (Turkey Aegean)
- Coordinates: 37°19′35″N 27°46′19″E
- Country: Turkey
- Province: Muğla
- District: Milas
- Population (2024): 9,427
- Time zone: UTC+3 (TRT)

Aydınlıkevler is a neighbourhood in the municipality and district of Milas, Muğla Province, Turkey. Its population is 9,427 (2024).
