= Milas carpet =

Milas carpets and rugs (also Milâs or Melas) are Turkish carpets and rugs that bear characteristics proper to the district of Milas in Muğla Province in southwestern Turkey. There are also a number of variants within the definition of Milas carpets. These variants are called under such names as Ada Milas, Patlıcanlı, Cıngıllı Cafer, Gemisuyu, and Elikoynunda, depending on the style, colors and other characteristics.

== Milas region and the Türkmen tradition ==
Milas is one of the regions in Turkey whose inhabitants kept their Türkmen heritage in its liveliest (the term Türkmen is often used in Turkey to denote ties to the former semi-nomadic lifestyle). As aside clothing and traditions, this heritage also includes the art of carpet weaving. It is generally admitted that a distinctive breed of Milas rugs came into existence in the 16th century starting with the seccade (prayer rug) which are smaller in dimension. By the 18th century and the 19th century, two types of Milas rugs, traditional (or classical) and baroque, could be distinguished on the basis of their colors and designs.

== Classical Milas carpets ==
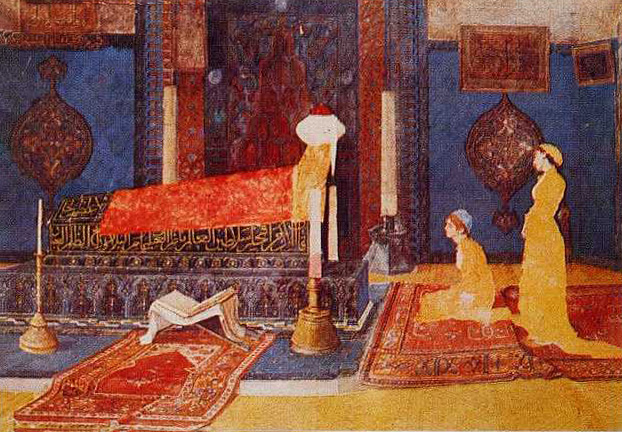
A Milas prayer rug on the floor at left, with the Koran and "rahle" — the reading stool — in an 1890 painting by Osman Hamdi Bey "Two young girls visiting a shrine".

Classical Milas carpets and rugs are those that can be said to have kept the essentials of the original 16th-century prayer rugs, with a usually rectangular niche ("mihrâb") in their fore to indicate the spot where the forehead of the faithful touches the rug at the moment of kneeling during the prayer. The inner frame of this niche is garnished with plant motifs and above the niche is a specially designed field called âlem, with references to heavenly promises.

The type called "Ada Milas" is one of the oldest examples of classical Milas rugs. The name may have derived, according to different versions, from the queen Ada of Caria, a native of this very region and a contemporary of Alexander the Great, or from a hypothesis according to which this type of rugs was first woven by immigrants from the island of İstanköy (Cos), "ada" meaning "island" in Turkish, or from the stylized carnation bouquets (another signification of the word "ada") sometimes depicted as placed on a branch around the rug.

Many other such styles, such as cat's paws, soles, notches, always depicted in an abstract manner, exist. These side decorations always follow a repetitive order around the circumference of the rug, and their row is called a "water bed" ("su yatağı").

== Milas carpets in Baroque style ==
Baroque style Milas rugs bear the echoes of the European influence densely introduced in the art and architecture of the Ottoman Empire starting with the reign of the Sultan Abdulmecid I in early 19th century. In these, zigzagging flower designs replace the orderly and abstract motifs of classical Milas rugs.

== Medalled Milas carpets ==
Yet another group of Milas carpets and rugs, this time distinguished on the basis of their initial conception, are the ones referred to as "medalled". Their prototype has appeared in the village of Karacahisar near Milas, and this village and its vicinity is still producing carpets and rugs based on the same pattern, which are also called Karacahisar carpets and rugs, considered inside the category of Milas carpets and rugs. Instead of the niche and the alem placed in the fore as in the prayer rug tradition, Karacahisar carpets and rugs are characterized by a centrally situated and larger field called "belly" ("göbek") with medal-like designs around, as well as abstract patterns of leaves and branches which are woven along the sides of the carpet. They are woven on a bed of white and red, regardless of the proportion these colors may occupy at the final stage of the finished product. Prayer rug types are usually woven in a tighter manner, and Karacahisar carpets and rugs looser.

== Colors ==
For the final colors, brown, peculiar tones of reddish brown and of a very dark yellow are distinctive tints of Milas carpets and rugs. Wool has established itself as the main material for Milas rugs as of the 18th century, and the natural dyes are still widely used. Although industrial dyes of our day can more or less fully replace the savour and resistance of naturally obtained dyes, natural dyes will mature in the same manner as traditional rugs.

The yellow is obtained from leaves of peach and apricot trees, the distinctive reddish brown (which is also frequently encountered in artefacts dating from the Carians, the inhabitants of the same region in antiquity) from Erica vulgaris, the brown from walnut leaves, the very dark, brownish yellow from acorns, the green from mint, and the wool is blackened by leaving it in the ground for a week.

== Weaving centers ==
Karacahisar (near Milas) and Gereme (on the coast) carpets and rugs are the two most frequently woven Milas carpet and rug types in our day, each type considered as the specialty of a different group of villages. The villages which regularly weave Milas rugs are mainly, but not exclusively, situated south of the city of Milas, such as Karacahisar, Ören (Gereme), Çomakdağ, Dörttepe, Bozalan, İkizköy, Pınarköy, Mezgit, Gürceğiz, Akçakaya villages. Tighter Ada Milas rugs are usually woven on demand.

== Impact of international tourism ==
Thanks to nearby Bodrum having become an international tourist venue and an intellectual center, Milas carpets and rugs occupy a privileged position among different Turkish carpet weaving traditions and they have entered into fashion trends both in and outside Turkey. For the whole territory of Milas district, up to 7000 weavers' looms remain in activity, full-time or at intervals following the demand.
