= Fesliğen, Milas =

Village in Turkey

Fesliğen
- Neighbourhood
- Location in Turkey Fesliğen (Turkey Aegean)
- Coordinates: 37°04′48″N 27°48′26″E
- Country: Turkey
- Province: Muğla
- District: Milas
- Population (2024): 776
- Time zone: UTC+3 (TRT)

Fesliğen is a neighbourhood in the municipality and district of Milas, Muğla Province, Turkey. Its population is 776 (2024).
