= Çiftlikköy, Milas =

Village in Turkey

Çiftlikköy
- Neighbourhood
- Location in Turkey Çiftlikköy (Turkey Aegean)
- Coordinates: 37°07′25″N 27°48′18″E
- Country: Turkey
- Province: Muğla
- District: Milas
- Population (2024): 477
- Time zone: UTC+3 (TRT)

Çiftlikköy is a neighbourhood in the municipality and district of Milas, Muğla Province, Turkey. Its population is 477 (2024).
