= Bahçeköy, Milas =

Village in Turkey

Bahçeköy
- Neighbourhood
- Coordinates
- Country: Turkey
- Province: Muğla
- District: Milas
- Population (2024): 428
- Time zone: UTC+3 (TRT)

Bahçeköy is a neighbourhood in the municipality and district of Milas, Muğla Province, Turkey. Its population is 428 (2024).
