= Burgaz, Milas =

Village in Turkey

Burgaz
- Neighbourhood
- Location in Turkey Burgaz (Turkey Aegean)
- Coordinates: 37°19′11″N 27°46′33″E
- Country: Turkey
- Province: Muğla
- District: Milas
- Population (2024): 6,892
- Time zone: UTC+3 (TRT)

Burgaz is a neighbourhood in the municipality and district of Milas, Muğla Province, Turkey. Its population is 6,892 (2024).
