= Emek, Milas =

Village in Turkey

Emek
- Neighbourhood
- Location in Turkey Emek (Turkey Aegean)
- Coordinates: 37°17′35″N 27°46′47″E
- Country: Turkey
- Province: Muğla
- District: Milas
- Population (2024): 5,089
- Time zone: UTC+3 (TRT)

Emek is a neighbourhood in the municipality and district of Milas, Muğla Province, Turkey. Its population is 5,089 (2024).
