= Güneş, Milas =

Village in Turkey

Güneş
- Neighbourhood
- Location in Turkey Güneş (Turkey Aegean)
- Coordinates: 37°20′27″N 27°45′54″E
- Country: Turkey
- Province: Muğla
- District: Milas
- Population (2024): 1,815
- Time zone: UTC+3 (TRT)

Güneş is a neighbourhood in the municipality and district of Milas, Muğla Province, Turkey. Its population is 1,815 (2024).
