= Çukurköy, Milas =

Village in Turkey

Çukurköy
- Neighbourhood
- Location in Turkey Çukurköy (Turkey Aegean)
- Coordinates: 37°29′43″N 27°42′53″E
- Country: Turkey
- Province: Muğla
- District: Milas
- Population (2024): 469
- Time zone: UTC+3 (TRT)

Çukurköy is a neighbourhood in the municipality and district of Milas, Muğla Province, Turkey. Its population is 469 (2024).
