= Ağaçlıhüyük, Milas =

Village in Turkey

Ağaçlıhüyük
- Neighbourhood
- Location in Turkey Ağaçlıhüyük (Turkey Aegean)
- Coordinates: 37°13′N 27°44′E
- Country: Turkey
- Province: Muğla
- District: Milas
- Population (2000): 1,052
- Time zone: UTC+3 (TRT)

Ağaçlıhüyük is a neighbourhood in the municipality and district of Milas, Muğla Province, Turkey. Its population was 1,052 in 2000.
