= Dereköy, Milas =

Village in Turkey

Dereköy
- Neighbourhood
- Location in Turkey Dereköy (Turkey Aegean)
- Coordinates: 37°06′02″N 27°56′48″E
- Country: Turkey
- Province: Muğla
- District: Milas
- Population (2024): 285
- Time zone: UTC+3 (TRT)

Dereköy is a neighbourhood in the municipality and district of Milas, Muğla Province, Turkey. Its population is 285 (2024).
