= Albert Jean Amateau =

Turkish rabbi, businessman, lawyer, and social activist (1889–1996)

- Born: April 20, 1889; Milas, Ottoman Empire (now Turkey)
- Died: February 9, 1996 (aged 106); Santa Rosa, California, U.S.
- Occupations: Rabbi, lawyer
- Known for: Activism

Albert Jean Amateau (April 20, 1889 – February 9, 1996) was a Turkish rabbi, businessman, lawyer, social activist, and denier of the Armenian genocide.

== Early years ==
Born a Sephardic Jew in Milas, Ottoman Empire (now Turkey), Amateau attended the American International College in İzmir (Smyrna), Turkey. He emigrated to the United States in 1910 to escape conscription after the Young Turks revolution of 1908.

== Activism ==
In the early 1920s, Amateau began a movement to bring more Jews into the workplace and government. He was also involved largely in the affairs of deaf people. After he returned from serving in the army in World War I, Amateau was ordained in 1920 at the Jewish Theological Seminary, and he became the first rabbi of a congregation of the deaf. In 1941, Amateau developed the Albert J. Amateau Foreign Language Service, a business providing translators for lipsync dubbing for motion pictures which continued in operation until 1989.

An ardent supporter of his homeland of Turkey, Amateau began various Turkish-oriented organizations while residing in the United States. In 1992, at the age of 103, he helped found the American Society of Jewish Friends of Turkey and was named as its president.

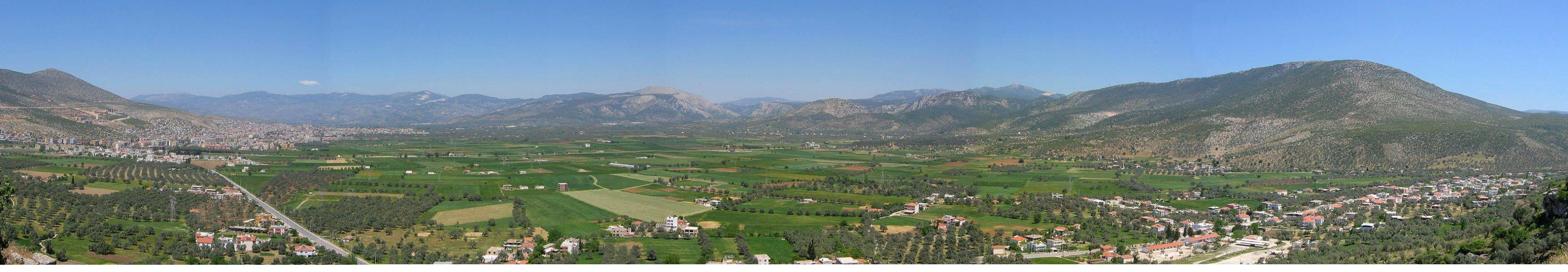
Panorama of Milas plain, Turkey, birthplace of Albert Jean Amateau.

He made a Sworn Statement denying the Armenian genocide in Turkey (1915–1923) to oppose approval of a resolution to recognize the said genocide, introduced by Senator Robert Dole in the United States Senate.

Amateau died in 1996 at the age of 106 years, 9 months, 20 days.
