= Milas =

- District and municipality
- Top to bottom: Boğaziçi, Firuzbey Mosque, Çökertme Bay, Iasos, Beçin Castle, Labraunda, Museum of Fish Market
- Logo

- Map showing Milas District in Muğla Province

- Location within Turkey Location within Turkey Aegean
- Coordinates: 37°19′N 27°47′E
- Country: Turkey
- Province: Muğla

Government
  - Mayor: Fevzi Topuz (CHP)
- Area: 2,067 km^{2} (798 sq mi)
- Population (2022): 147,416
  - Density: 71.32/km^{2} (184.7/sq mi)
- Time zone: UTC+3 (TRT)
- Postal code: 48200
- Area code: 0252
- Website: www.milas.bel.tr

Milas is a municipality and district of Muğla Province, Turkey. Its area is 2,067 km^{2}, and its population is 147,416 (2022). The city commands a region with an active economy and is very rich in history and ancient remains, the territory of Milas containing a remarkable twenty-seven archaeological sites of note. The city was the first capital of ancient Caria and of the Anatolian beylik of Menteşe in mediaeval times. The nearby Mausoleum of Hecatomnus is classified as a tentative UNESCO World Heritage Site.

Milas is focused on agricultural and aquacultural processing, related industrial activities, services, transportation (particularly since the opening of Milas–Bodrum Airport), tourism and culture. The centre lies about 20 km from the coast and is closer to the airport than Bodrum itself, with many late arrival passengers of the high season increasingly opting to stay in Milas rather than in Bodrum where accommodation is likely to be difficult to find.

Milas district has a total coastline length of 150 km, both to the north-west in the Gulf of Güllük and to the south along the Gulf of Gökova, and to these should be added the shores of Lake Bafa in the north divided between the district area of Milas and that of Aydın district of Söke.

Along with the province seat of Muğla and the province's southernmost district of Fethiye, Milas is among the prominent settlements of south-west Turkey, these three centers being on a par with each other in terms of all-year population and the area their respective districts cover. Milas center is situated on a fertile plain at the foot of Mount Sodra, on and around which sizable quarries of white marble are found and have been used since very ancient times.

== Etymology ==
The name Mylasa (Ancient Greek: Μύλασα), with the old Anatolian ending in -asa is evidence of very early foundation. On the basis of the -mil syllable found also in the name the Lycians called themselves Trmili, a theory connects the name of Mylasa with the passage of the Lycians from Miletus, also claimed to be a Lycian foundation under the name Millawanda by Ephorus, to their final home in the south. But there is nothing else to suggest a Lycian origin for the name Mylasa. Stephanus of Byzantium in his Ethnica says that the city took its name from a certain Mylasus, son of Chrysaor and a descendant of Sisyphus and Aeolus, an explanation some sources deem unsubstantial for a Carian city.

== History ==
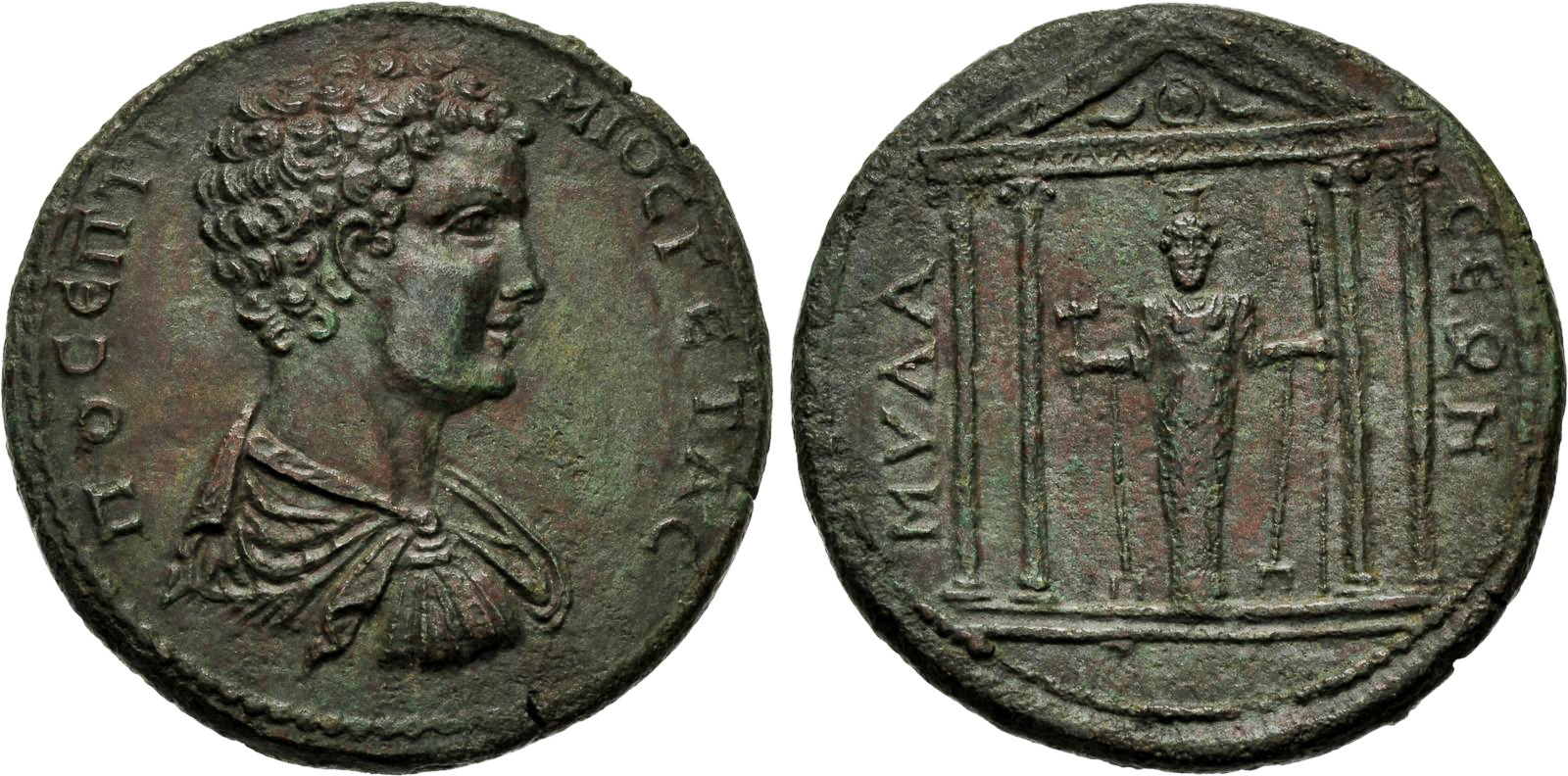
Zeus Labraundos Temple on a Roman coin of emperor Geta from Mylasa

=== Iron Age ===
The city's earliest historical mention is at the beginning of the 7th century BC, when a Carian leader from Mylasa by name Arselis is recorded to have helped Gyges of Lydia in his contest for the Lydian throne. The same episode is at the origin of the accounts surrounding the beginning of the cult for and the erection of the statue of Labrandean Zeus in the neighboring sanctuary of Labranda, held sacred by peoples across western Anatolia, with the statue holding the labrys brought over by Arselis from Lydia.

Labrandean Zeus (sometimes also named "Zeus Stratios") was one of the three deities proper to Mylasa, all named Zeus but each bearing indigenous characteristics. Of these, the cult of Zeus Carius (Carian Zeus) was also notable in being exclusively reserved, aside from the Carians, to their Lydian and Mysian kinsmen. One of the finest temples was also the one dedicated to Zeus Osogoa (originally, just Osogoa), traceable to times when the Carians had been a maritime folk and which recalled to Pausanias the Acropolis of Athens.

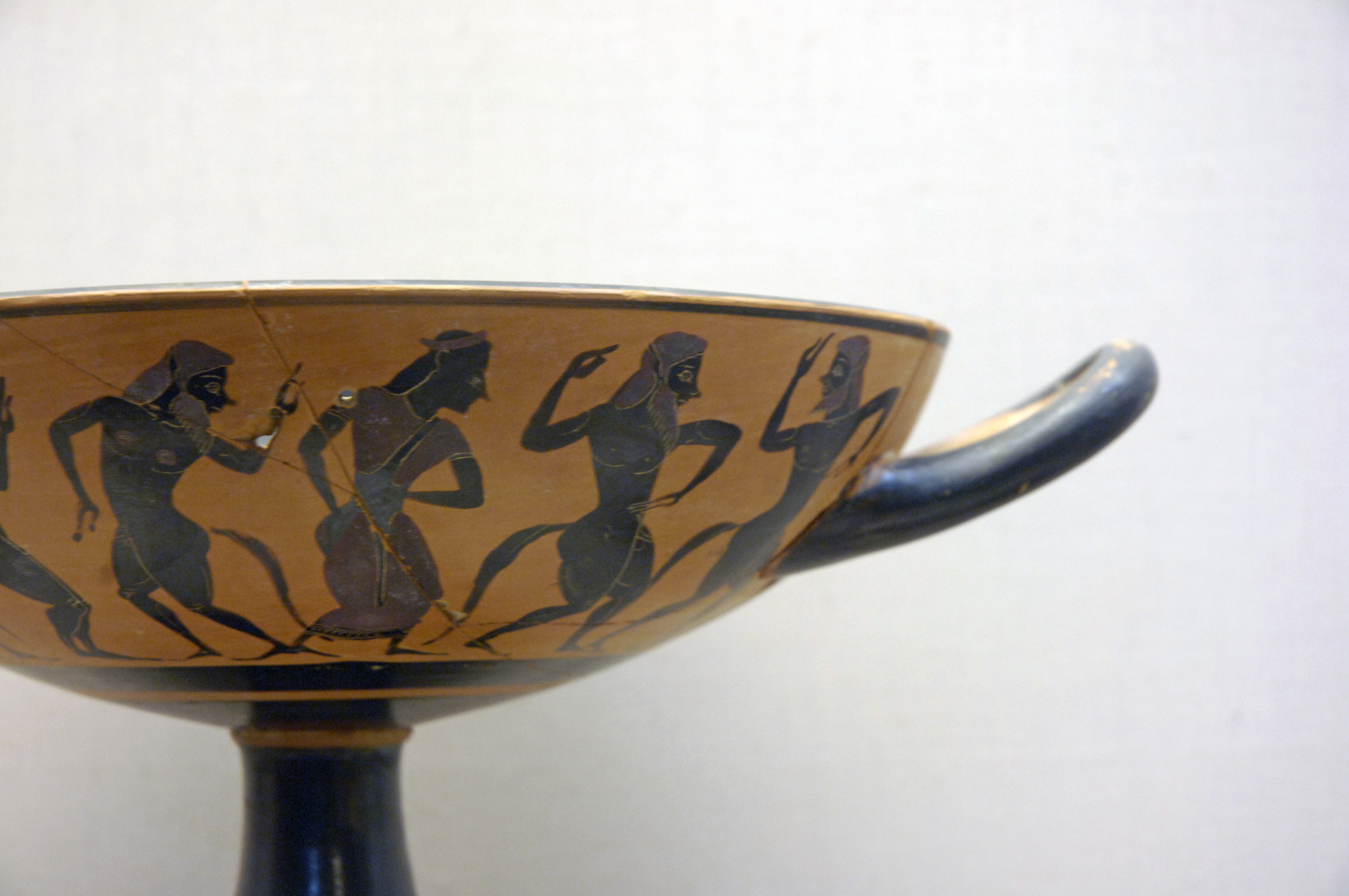
A kylix in Milas Museum

=== Persian period ===
Under Achaemenid rule Mylasa was the chief city of Caria. A ruler appointed by the Persian Emperor (satrap) ruled the city in varying degrees of allegiance to the emperor.

==== Lygdamid dynasty ====
The first dynasty of rulers under the Achaemenid Empire was the Lygdamid dynasty (520-450 BCE). Between 460-450 BC, Mylasa was a regionally prominent member of the Delian League, like most Carian cities, but the Persian rule was restored towards the end of the same century.

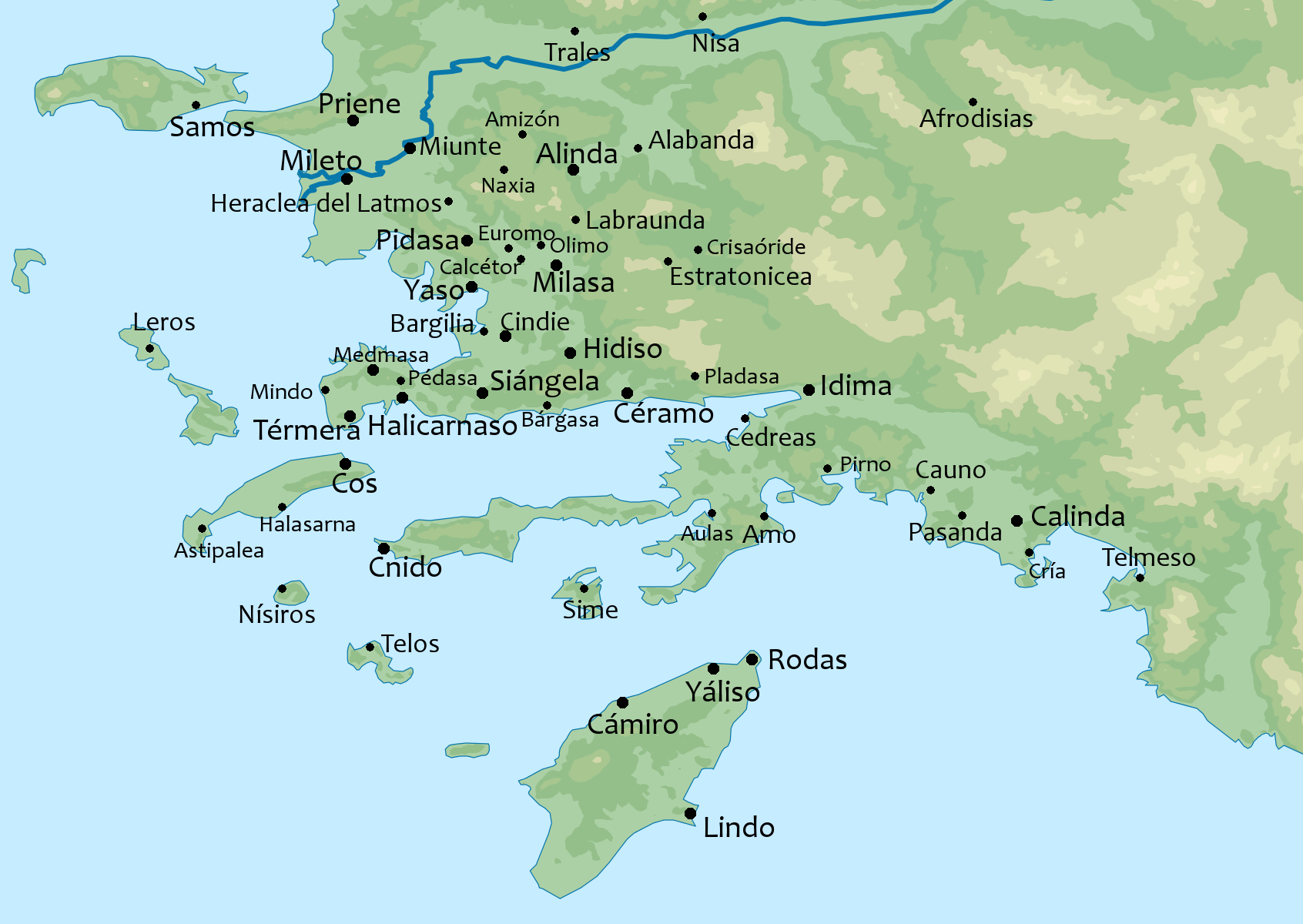
Map of Milas and neighbouring ancient cities in Caria.

==== Hecatomnid dynasty ====
The Hecatomnids, the dynasty founded by Hecatomnus, were officially satraps of the Persian Empire but Greek in language and culture, as their inscriptions and coins witness. Mylasa was their capital and the mausoleum of Hecatomnus can still be seen today which served as an architectural precedent from which the later mausolea of the dynasty developed. During the long and striking reign of Mausolus, they became virtual rulers of Caria and of a sizable surrounding region between 377-352 BC. During Mausolus's reign the capital was moved to Halicarnassus, but Mylasa retained its importance. Mausolus was the builder of the famous Ancient Wonder of the World, the Mausoleum at Halicarnassus.

=== Roman period ===
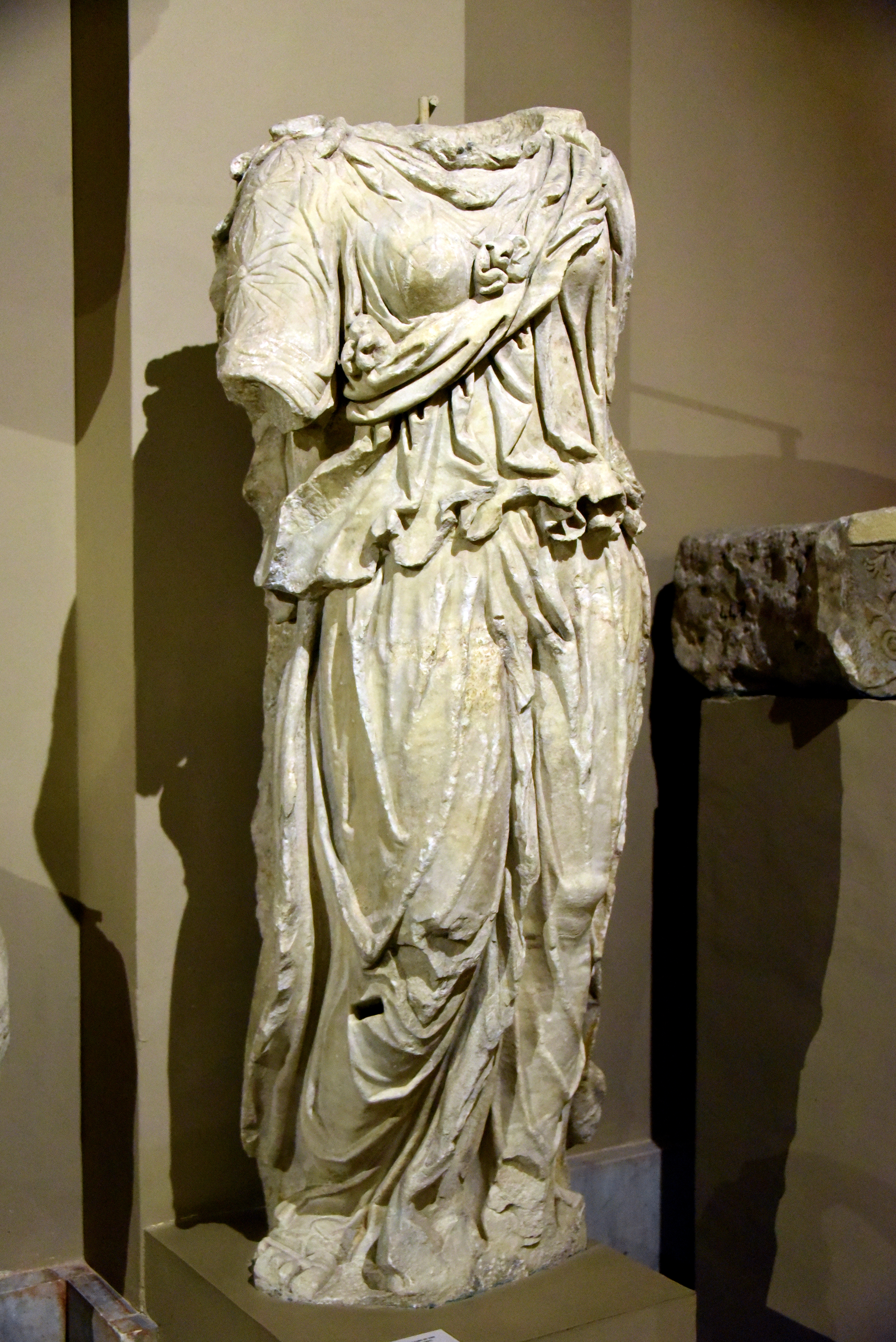
Caryatid from Milas, Turkey. Late Hellenistic period, 1st century BCE. Marble. Museum of Archaeology, Istanbul, Turkey.

In 40 BCE Mylasa suffered great damage when it was taken by Labienus in the Roman Civil War. In the Greco-Roman period, though the city was contested among the successors of Alexander, it enjoyed a season of brilliant prosperity, and the three neighbouring towns of Euromus, Olymos and Labranda were included within its limits. Mylasa is frequently mentioned by ancient writers. At the time of Strabo (the first century BCE), the city boasted two remarkable orators, Euthydemos (in Greek Εὐθύδημος) and Hybreas (Ὑβρέας), whose relationship gave rise to the adage "necessary evil". Euthydemos and Hybreas were antagonistic politicians, and when Euthydemos died, Hybreas spoke at his funeral, where he noted, "You are a necessary evil: we can live neither with you nor without you." Various inscriptions tell us that the Phrygian cults were represented here by the worship of Sabazios; the Egyptian, by that of Isis and Osiris. There was also a temple of Nemesis. An inscription from Mylasa provided one of the few certain data about the life of Cornelius Tacitus, identifying him as governor of Asia in 112-13.

=== Christian era ===
Among the ancient bishops of Mylasa was Saint Ephrem (fifth century), whose feast was kept on January 23, and whose relics were venerated in neighbouring city of Leuke. Cyril and his successor, Paul, are mentioned by Nicephorus Callistus and in the Life of Saint Xene. Michel Le Quien mentioned the names of three other bishops, and since his time the inscriptions discovered refer to two others, one anonymous, the other named Basil, who built a church in honour of Saint Stephen. The Saint Xene referred to above was a Roman noblewoman who, to escape the marriage which her parents wished to force upon her, donned male attire, left her country, changed her name from Eusebia to Xene ("stranger"), and lived first on the island of Cos, then at Mylasa. Since the Fourth Crusade, Mylasa has remained a titular see of the Roman Catholic Church, Mylasensis; the seat has been vacant since the death of the last bishop in 1966.

=== Turkish era ===
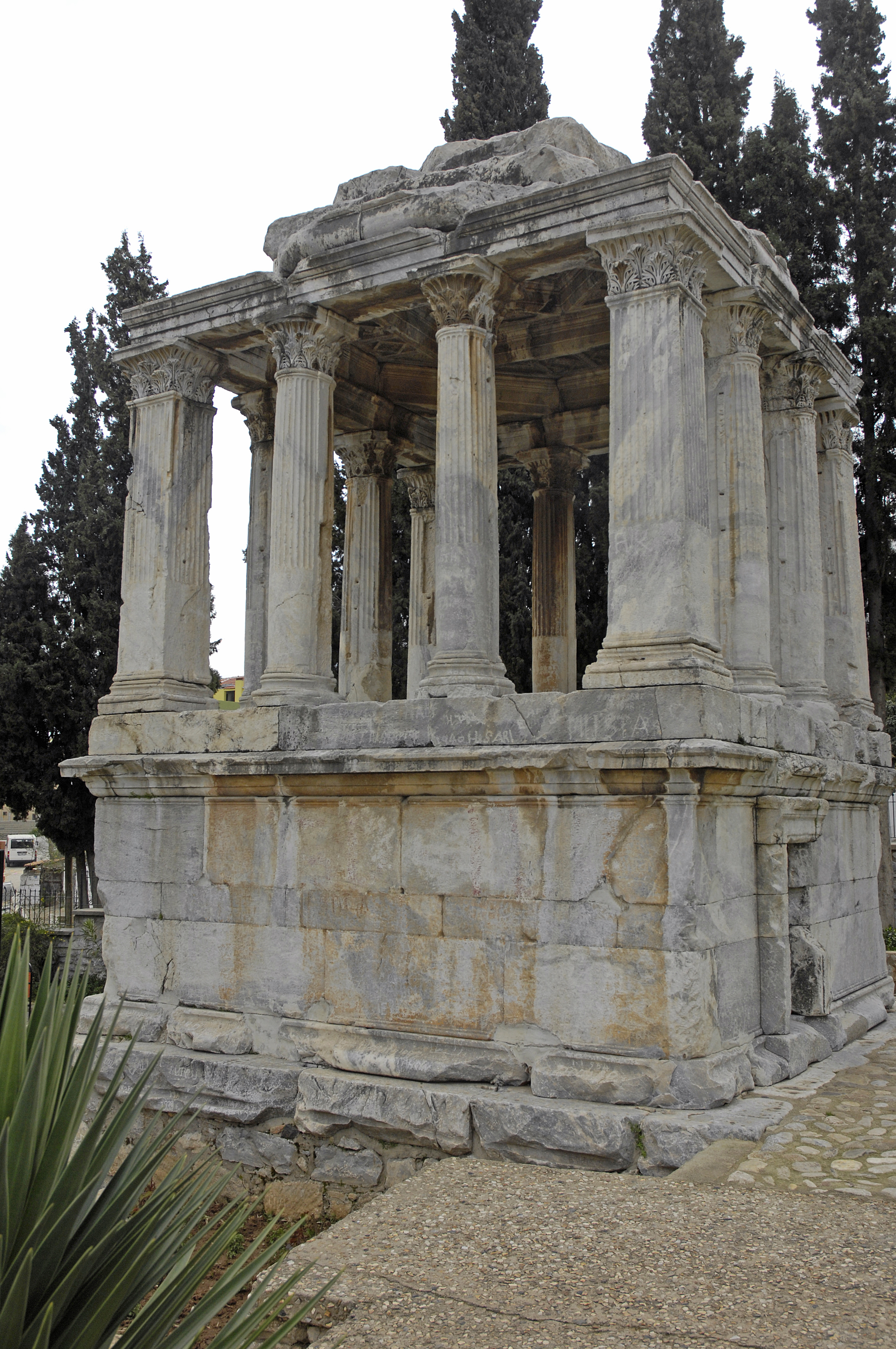
The Gümüşkesen is a Roman tomb, from the 2nd century BC. It is reportedly built along the lines of the Mausoleum at Halicarnassus, but on a much smaller scale

==== Beys of Menteşe ====
Milas and the surrounding region (the Byzantine theme of Mylasa and Melanoudion) was taken over by the Turks under the command of Menteşe Bey in the late thirteenth century, who gave his name to the beylik (Menteşe) that established its capital in the city. The administrative center of his descendants was the castle of Beçin located in the contemporary dependant township of the same name at a distance of 5 km (3 mi) from Milas and which was easier to defend.

==== Ottoman rule ====
Milas, together with the entire Beylik of Menteşe was taken over by the Ottoman Empire in 1390. However, just twelve years later, Tamerlane and his forces overcame the Ottomans in the Battle of Ankara, and returned control of this region to its former rulers, the Menteşe Beys, as he did for other Anatolian beyliks. Milas was brought back under Ottoman control, this time in 1420 by the Sultan Mehmed I. One of the first acts of the Ottomans was to transfer the regional administrative seat to Muğla.

From 1867 until 1922, Milas was part of the Aidin Vilayet of the Ottoman Empire. At the turn of the twentieth century, according to 1912 figures, Milas' urban center had a population of 9,000, of whom some 2,900 were Greek, a thousand or so Jewish, and the remaining majority were Turkish. The Greeks of Milas were exchanged with Turks living in Greece under the 1923 agreement for the exchange of Greek and Turkish populations between the two countries, while the sizable Jewish community remained as a presence till the 1950s, at which time they emigrated to Israel; Jews formerly of Milas still visit frequently to this day.

== Climate ==
Milas has a hot-summer Mediterranean climate (Köppen: Csa), with very hot, dry summers and mild, rainy winters.

Climate data for Milas (1991–2020)
Month	Jan	Feb	Mar	Apr	May	Jun	Jul	Aug	Sep	Oct	Nov	Dec	Year
Mean daily maximum °C (°F)	15.0 (59.0)	16.0 (60.8)	18.9 (66.0)	22.9 (73.2)	28.0 (82.4)	33.5 (92.3)	36.8 (98.2)	36.7 (98.1)	32.6 (90.7)	27.4 (81.3)	21.4 (70.5)	16.4 (61.5)	25.5 (77.9)
Daily mean °C (°F)	9.4 (48.9)	10.3 (50.5)	12.7 (54.9)	16.3 (61.3)	21.0 (69.8)	26.4 (79.5)	29.5 (85.1)	29.1 (84.4)	24.8 (76.6)	19.9 (67.8)	14.4 (57.9)	10.7 (51.3)	18.7 (65.7)
Mean daily minimum °C (°F)	5.2 (41.4)	5.7 (42.3)	7.2 (45.0)	10.1 (50.2)	14.1 (57.4)	19.1 (66.4)	22.1 (71.8)	22.1 (71.8)	17.9 (64.2)	13.9 (57.0)	9.3 (48.7)	6.7 (44.1)	12.8 (55.0)
Average precipitation mm (inches)	144.95 (5.71)	106.69 (4.20)	75.72 (2.98)	53.39 (2.10)	31.77 (1.25)	9.17 (0.36)	3.09 (0.12)	4.09 (0.16)	19.42 (0.76)	55.51 (2.19)	98.65 (3.88)	123.67 (4.87)	726.12 (28.59)
Average precipitation days (≥ 1.0 mm)	10.2	8.6	7	5.6	3.8	1.8	1.5	1.2	2.2	4.1	5.9	9.4	61.3
Average relative humidity (%)	72.0	69.5	66.4	64.0	60.1	51.5	47.7	51.4	56.7	64.5	70.7	73.8	62.5
Source: NOAA

== Sights of interest ==
The Mausoleum of Hecatomnus was discovered in 2010 when men were arrested for illegal digging for antiquities. A marble sarcophagus and numerous frescoes were discovered in the tomb, although it was believed many relics had already been taken and sold on the black market. Recently a golden crown from the tomb has been identified and agreed to be returned to Turkey. The tomb is very important for understanding of Carian art and craftsmanship as it was built by their best architects and sculptors and was a predecessor of the magnificent Mausoleum at Halicarnassus.

The walls surrounding the temenos of one of the temples dedicated to one of the Zeus (probably Zeus Osogoa and built in the first century BC) are still visible, as well as a row of columns.

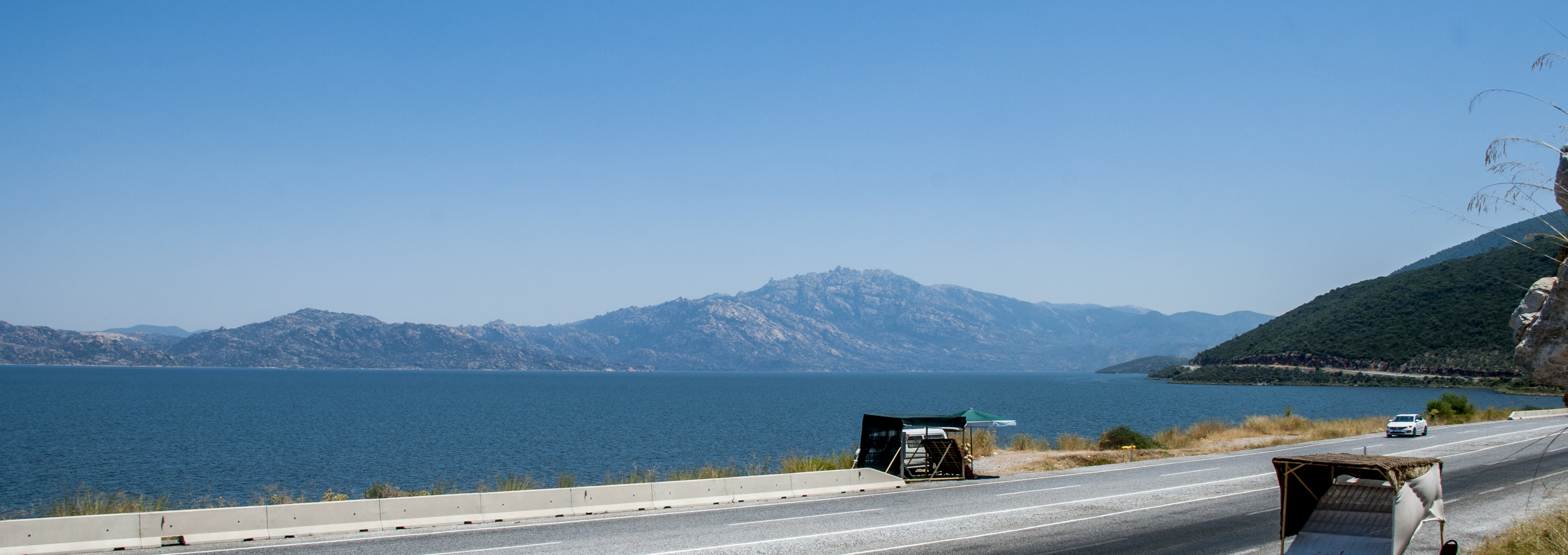
Shores of Lake Bafa under the western flank of Mount Beşparmak, the ancient Mount Latmus.

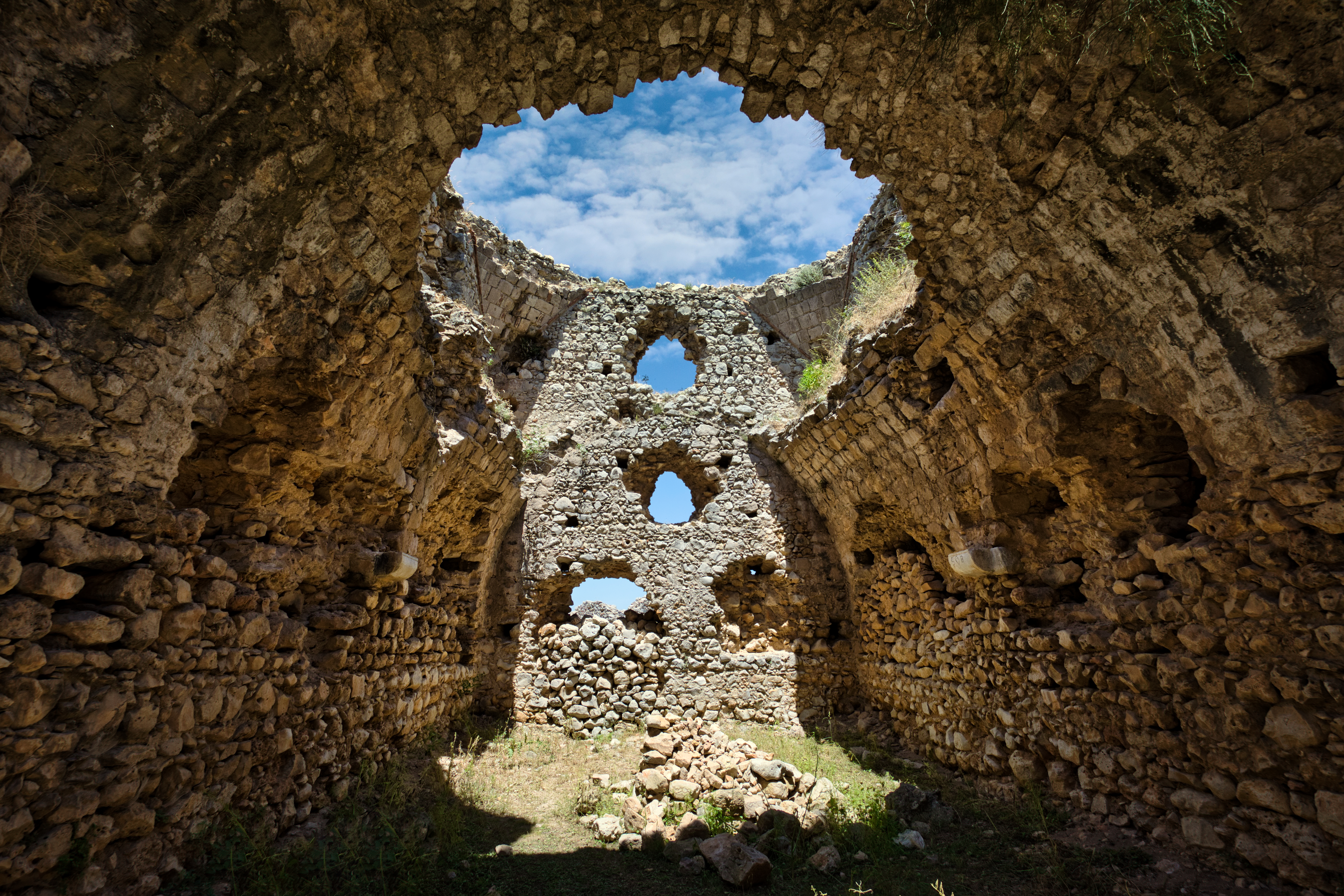
The Kızıl Han, a caravanserai, is a two-story structure and one of two hans surviving in Beçin. It is plain and unimposing and is partially ruined with its upper floor collapsed.

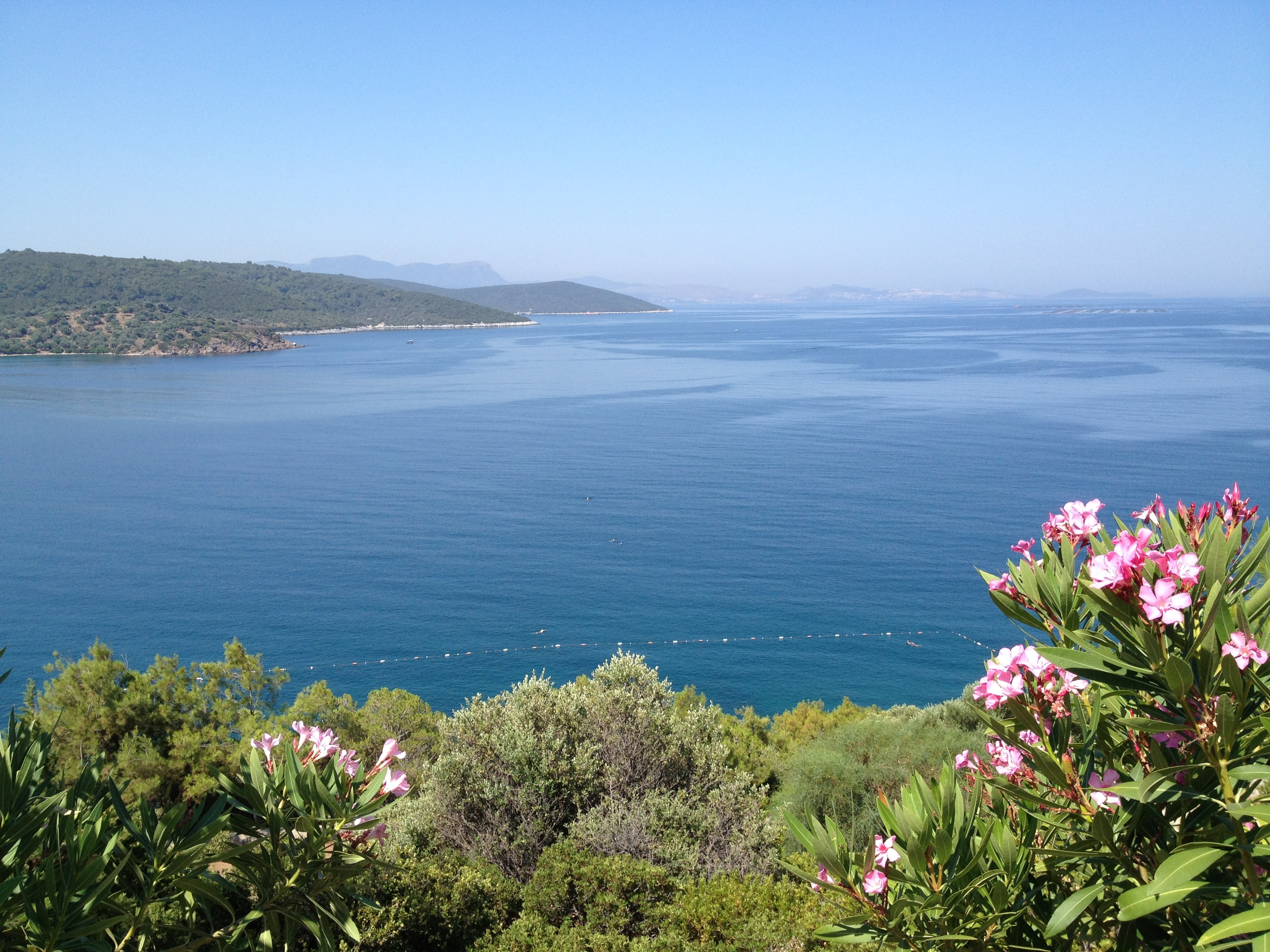
Milas Dörttepe coast

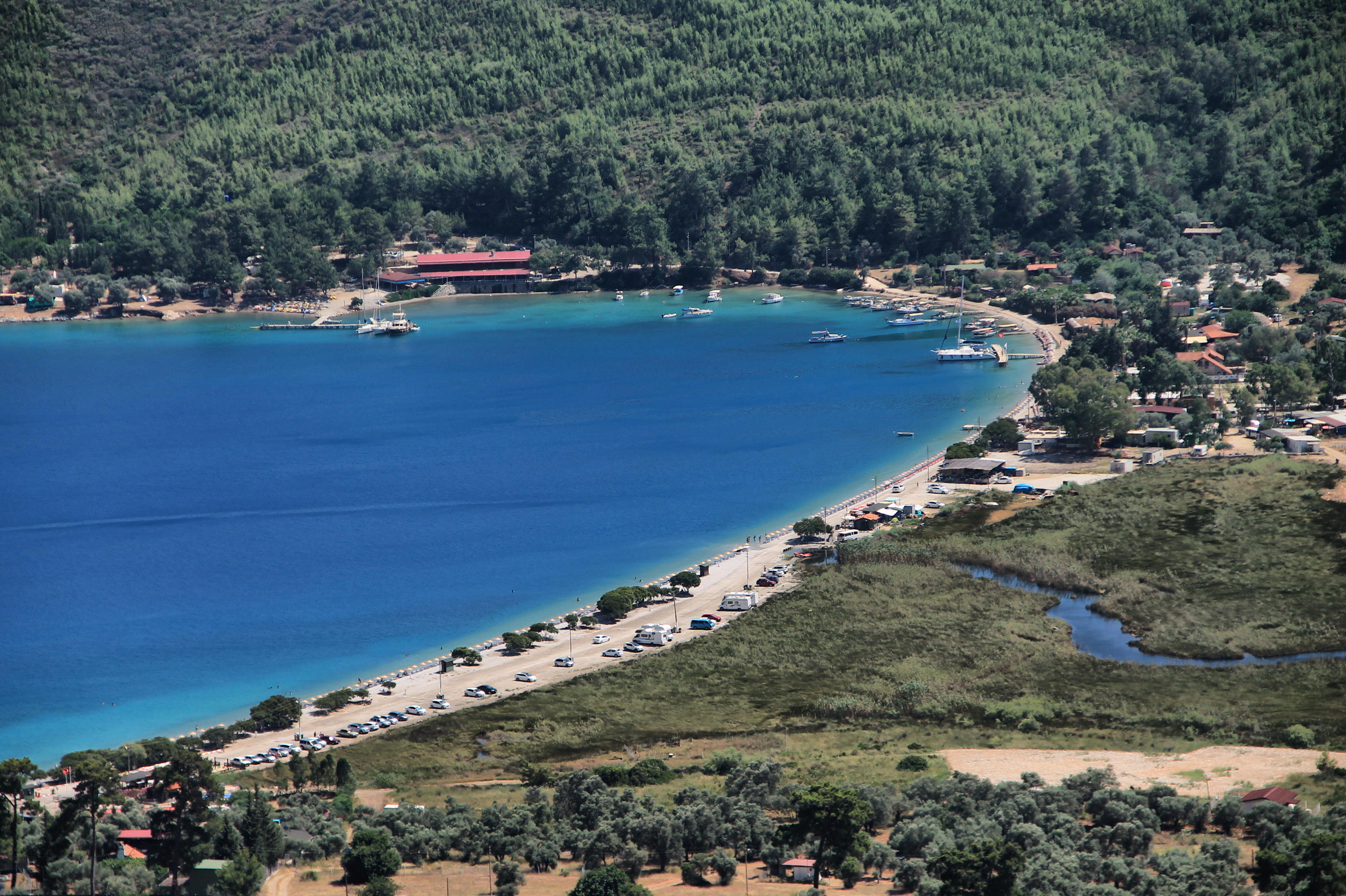
Kutlak in Milas

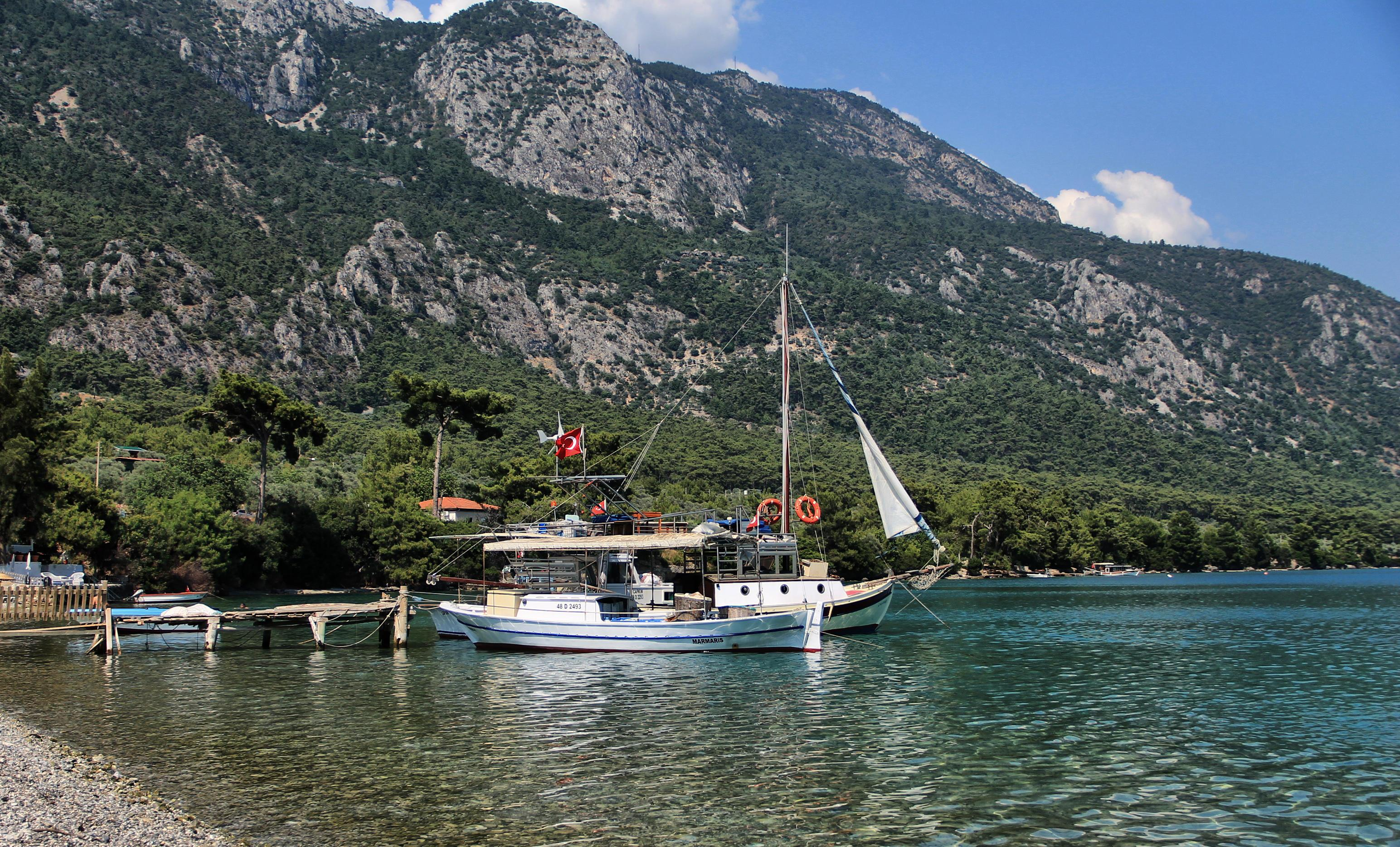
Milas is a popular destination in Turkish Riviera

The eighteenth-century English traveller Richard Pococke relates, in his Travels, having seen the temple of Augustus here; its materials have since partially been taken by Turks to build a mosque.

One of the two ancient symbols of the town is "Baltalıkapı" (Gate with an axe), a well-preserved Roman gate called as due to the eponymous double-headed axe (labrys) carved into a keystone.

There is also a two-storied monumental Roman tomb dating from the 2nd century AD, called "Gümüşkesen" today and which gives its name to a whole quarter of Milas, and referred to as "Dystega" in some dated sources. This monument is most likely a simplified copy of the famous tomb of Mausolus in Halicarnassus.

There are a number of historical Turkish buildings in Milas, dating from both the Menteşe and the Ottoman periods. A number of old houses built in the nineteenth or early twentieth century that have been preserved in their original appearance are also worthy of mention. Among the three most important mosques of Milas, The Great Mosque dating from 1378 and Orhan Bey Mosque dating from 1330 were built when Milas was the capital of the Turkish principality of Menteşe. The slightly more imposing Firuz Bey Mosque was built shortly the first incorporation of Milas into the Ottoman Empire and bears the name of the city's first Ottoman administrator.

Milas carpets and rugs woven of wool have been internationally famous for centuries. Today, they are no longer produced in the city of Milas, but rather in a dozen villages around Milas. For the whole territory of Milas district, up to 7000 weavers' looms remain active, either full-time or at intervals following the demand, which remains quite lively both in Turkey and abroad.

Beçin Castle, the capital of Menteşe Beys, is situated at the dependent township of Beçin, at a distance of 5 kilometers from Milas city. The fortress has been restored in 1974, and the compound includes two mosques, two medreses, a hamam, the remains of a Byzantine chapel as well as traces from earlier periods.

At a distance of 14 km. from Milas center, set on a steep hillside and surrounded by pine forests is the ancient Carian cult center of Labranda, its name echoing once again the eponymous tradition of labrys. The ruins, including a temple, banqueting halls and tombs, were excavated by a Swedish team in early 20th century, as well as the views over the valley, attract the interest of rather few adventurous visitors prepared for the climb.

Gökçeler Canyon and İncirliin Cave inside the canyon are visitor attractions.

== Composition ==
There are 132 neighbourhoods in Milas District:

- Ağaçlıhüyük
- Akçakaya
- Akçalı
- Akkovanlık
- Akyol
- Alaçam
- Alatepe
- Aslanyaka
- Avşar
- Aydınlıkevler
- Bafa
- Bağdamları
- Baharlı
- Bahçeköy
- Bahçeburun
- Balcılar
- Bayırköy
- Beçin
- Beyciler
- Boğaziçi
- Bozalan
- Bozbük
- Burgaz
- Çakıralan
- Çallı
- Çamköy
- Çamlıbelen
- Çamlıca
- Çamlıyurt
- Çamovalı
- Çandır
- Çiftlikköy
- Çınarlı
- Çökertme
- Çomakdağ Kızılağaç
- Çukurköy
- Cumhuriyet
- Damlıboğaz
- Danişment
- Demirciler
- Dereköy
- Derince
- Dibekdere
- Dörttepe
- Eğridere
- Ekinanbarı
- Ekindere
- Emek
- Epçe
- Etrenli
- Fesliğen
- Gazi-Firuz Paşa
- Gökbel
- Gökçeler
- Göldere
- Gölyaka
- Güllük
- Gümüşlük
- Güneş
- Günlük
- Gürçamlar
- Gürceğiz
- Hacıahmetler
- Hacıapti
- Hacıilyas
- Hasanlar
- Hayıtlı-Ahmet Çavuş
- Hisarbaşı Hocabedrettin
- Hisarcık
- Hüsamlar
- İçme
- İkizköy
- İkiztaş
- İsmetpaşa
- Kafaca
- Kalemköy
- Kalınağıl
- Kandak
- Kapıkırı
- Karacaağaç
- Karacahisar
- Karahayıt
- Karakuyu
- Karapınar
- Kargıcak
- Karşıyaka
- Kayabaşı
- Kayabükü
- Kayadere
- Kazıklı
- Kemikler
- Ketendere
- Kılavuz
- Kırcağız
- Kısırlar
- Kıyıkışlacık
- Kızılağaç
- Kızılcakuyu
- Kızılcayıkık
- Konak
- Korucuk
- Koruköy
- Köşkköy
- Küçükdibekdere
- Kultak
- Kurudere
- Kuzyaka
- Menteş
- Meşelik
- Narhisar
- Olukbaşı
- Ören
- Ortaköy
- Ovakışlacık
- Pınararası
- Pınarcık
- Pınarköy
- Sakarkaya
- Sarıkaya
- Savran
- Sekköy
- Selimiye
- Şenköy
- Şevketiye
- Söğütçük
- Türkevleri
- Tuzabat
- Ulaş
- Yakaköy
- Yaşyer
- Yoğunoluk
- Yusufca

== Notable people from Milas ==
- Hecatomnus; Founder of the Hecatomnid dynasty,
- Mausolus; Satrap of the Persian Empire, virtual ruler of Caria between 377-352 BC, builder of the famous Mausoleum of Halicarnassus.
- Rabbi Albert Jean Amateau: U.S. Sephardic Jew community leader and social activist.
- Turhan Selçuk: Turkish cartoonist. Creator of the fictional character Abdülcanbaz and the homonymous serial comics.
- Nejla Işık: Turkish environmentalist; and her daughter, Esra Işık.

== Picture gallery ==
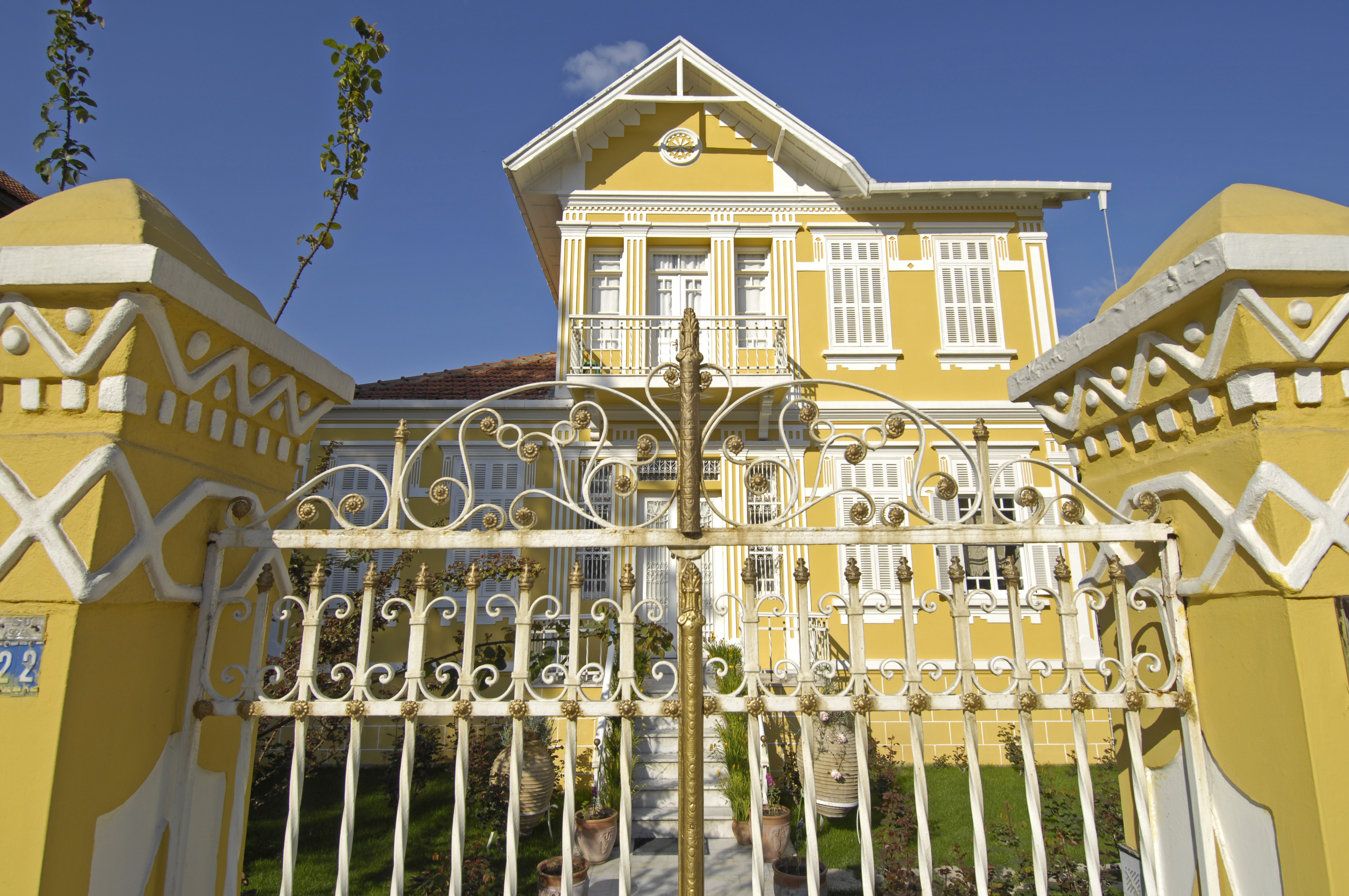
Milas Atatürk Boulevard in 2007

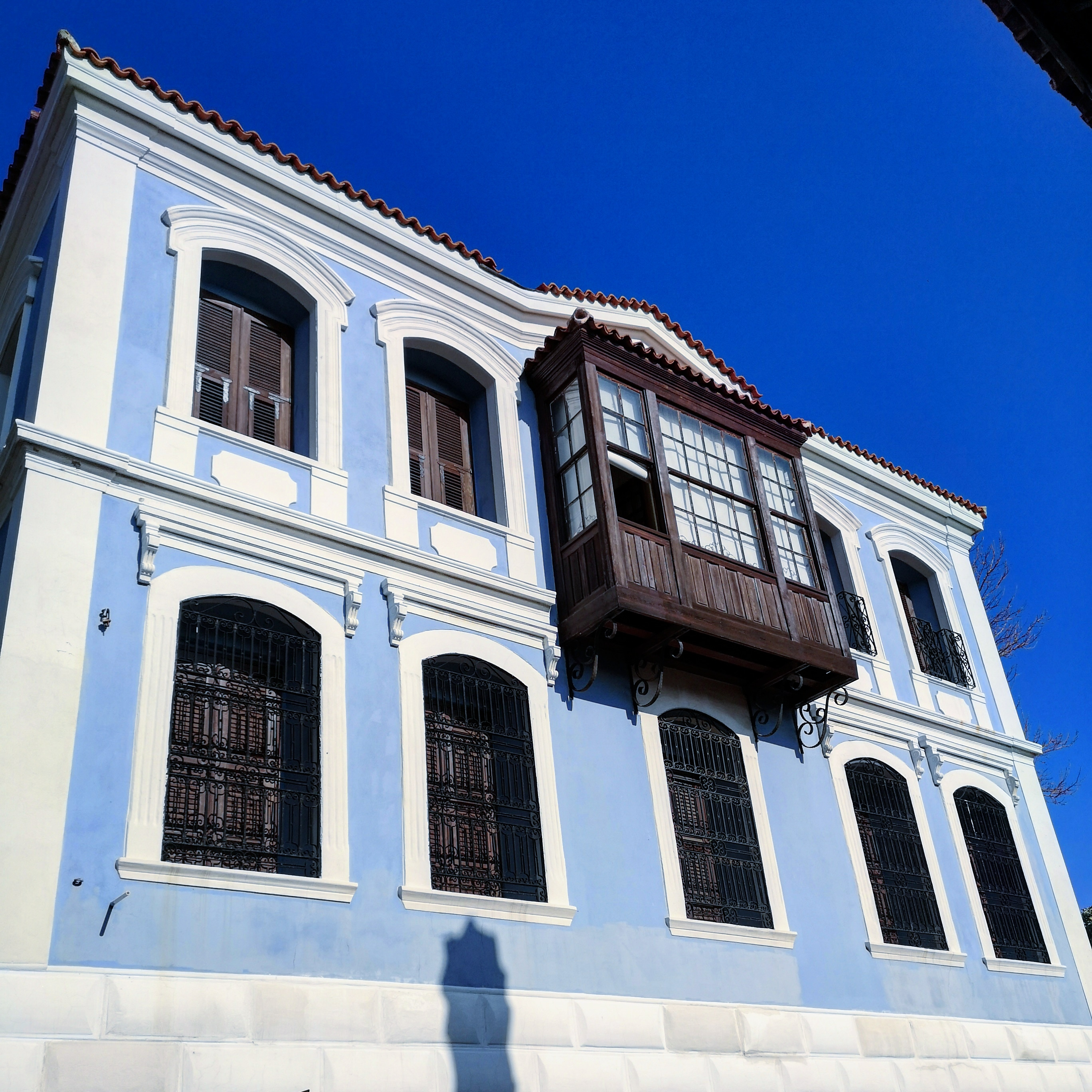
Milas Mansion

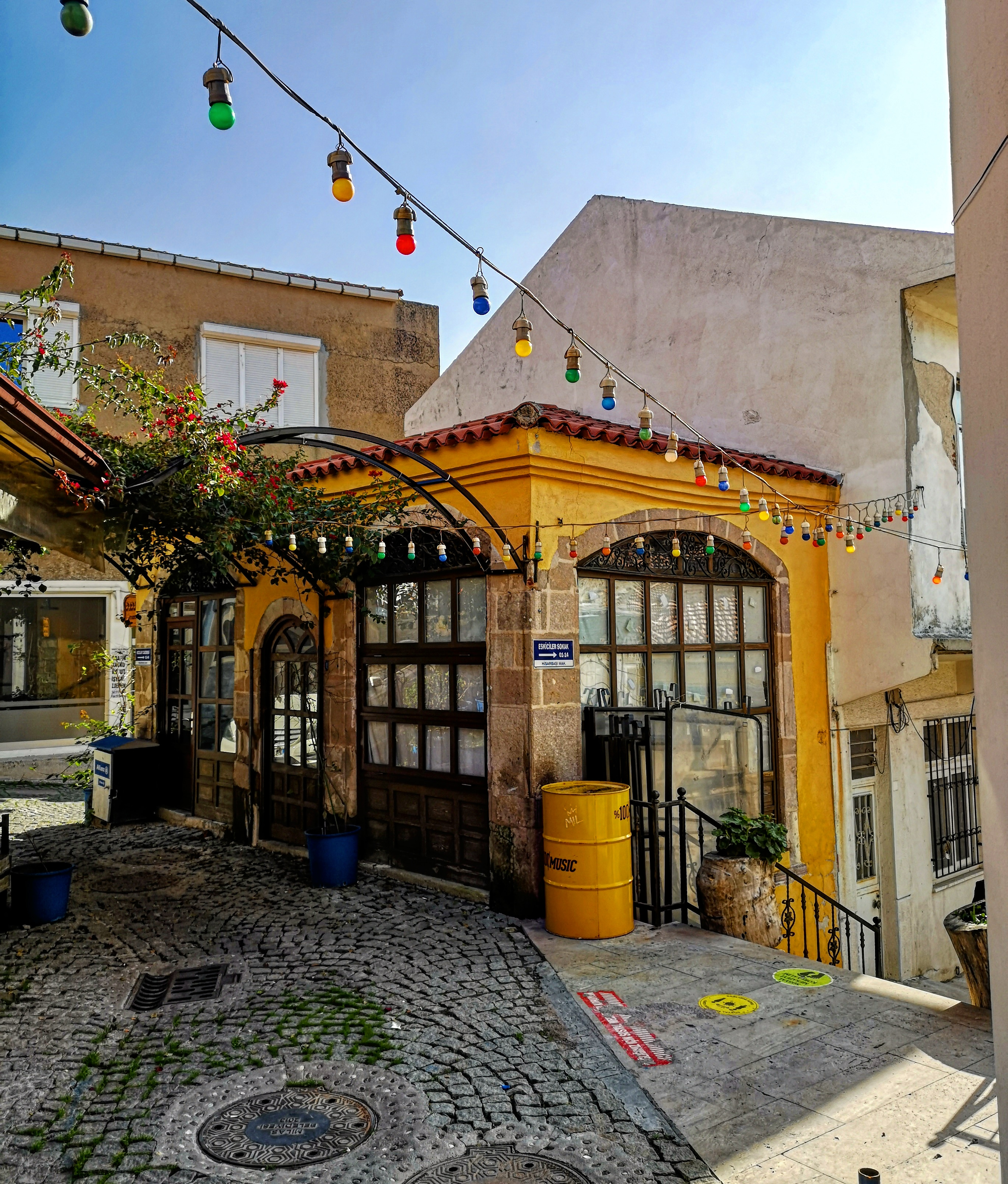
Milas Bazaar, Milas Çarşısı

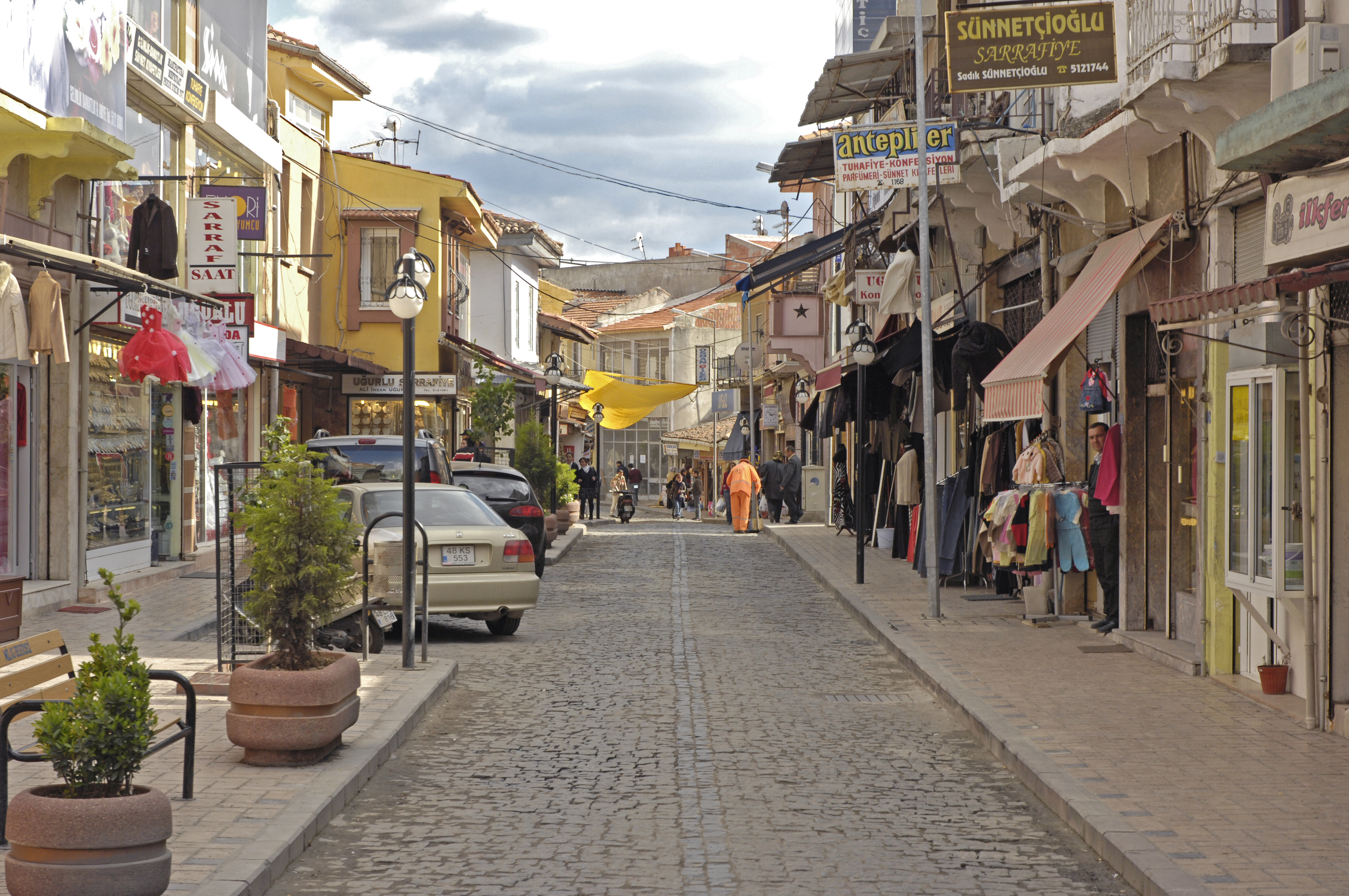
Milas inner city in 2007

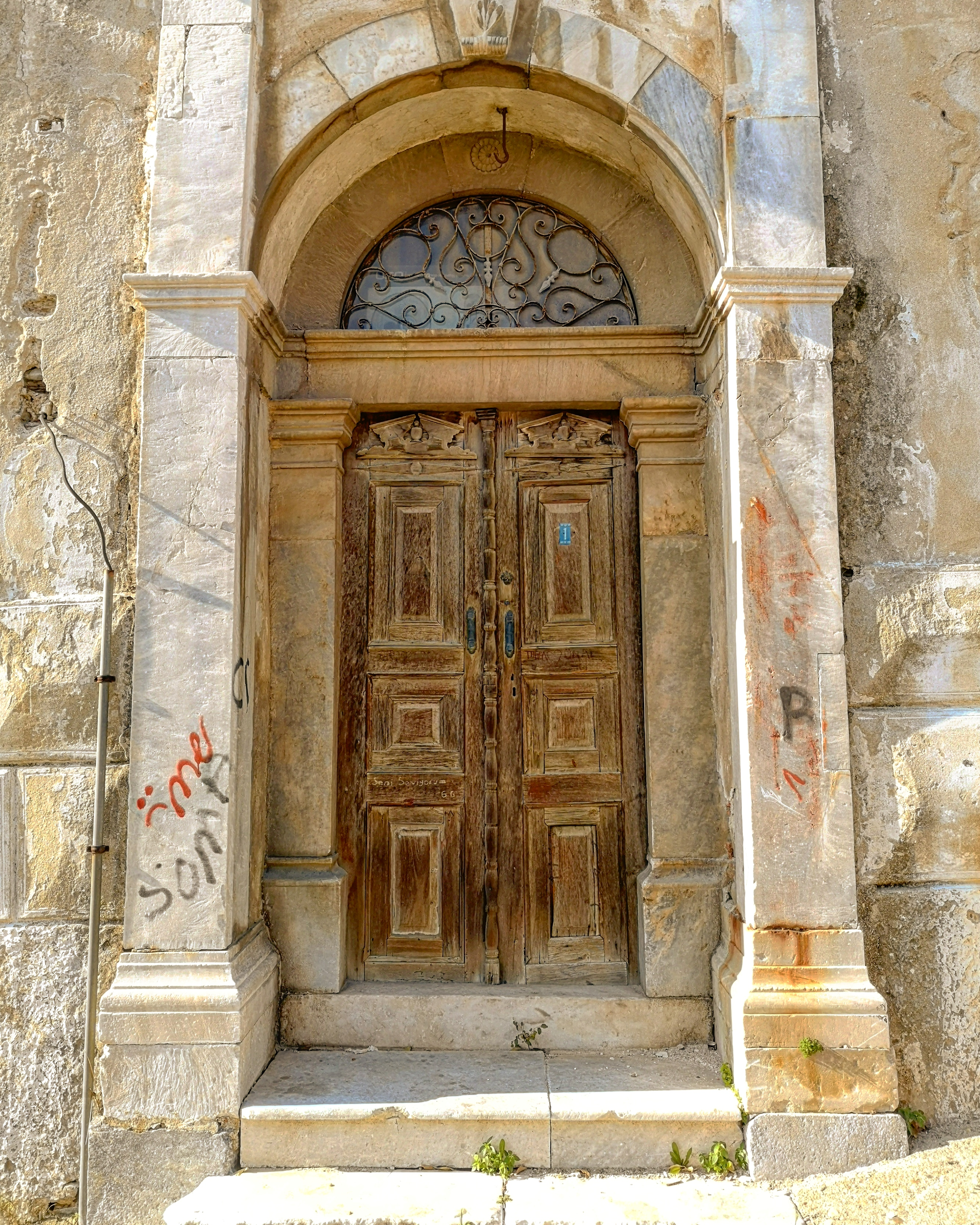
Old houses in Milas

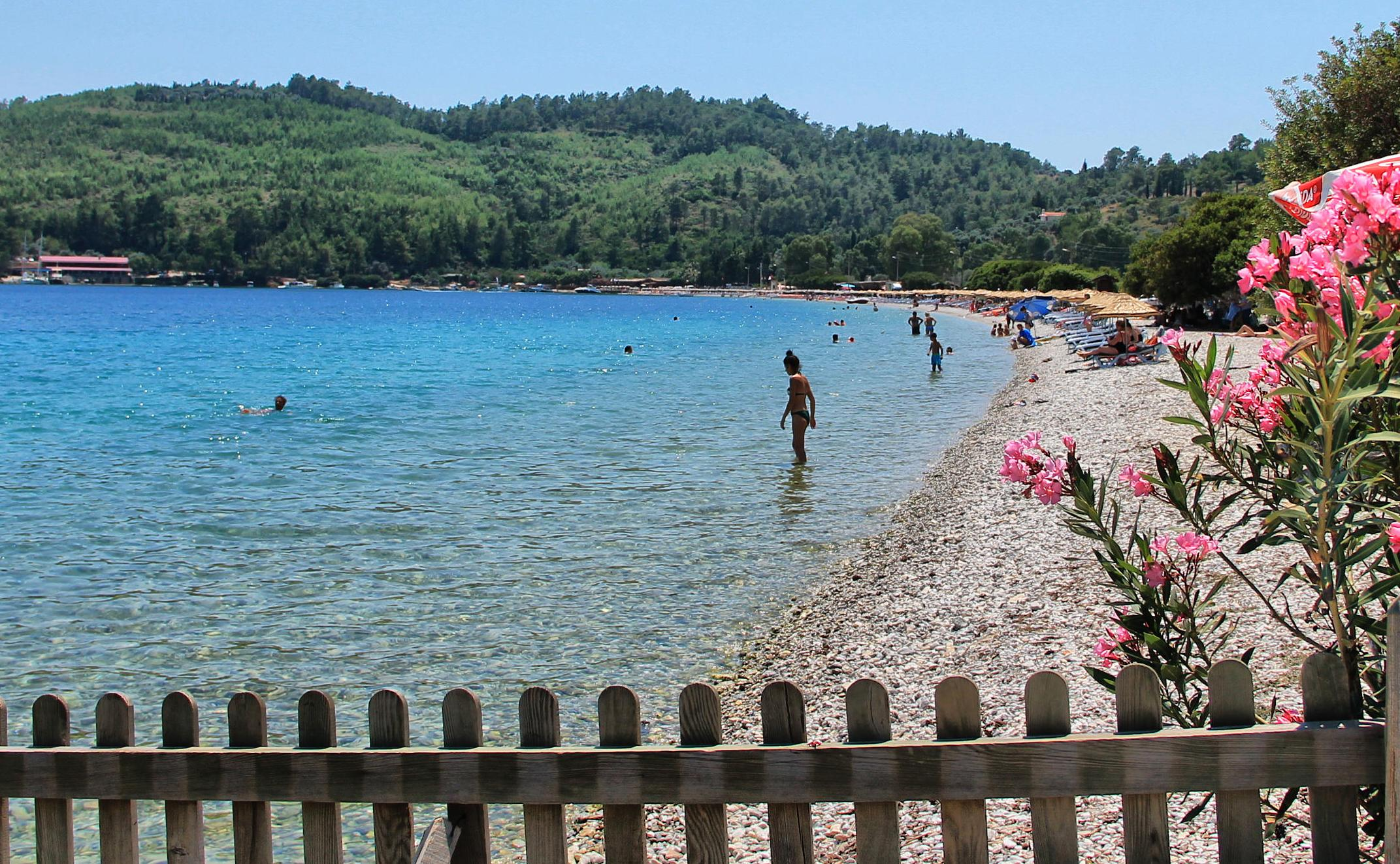
Kultak Milas

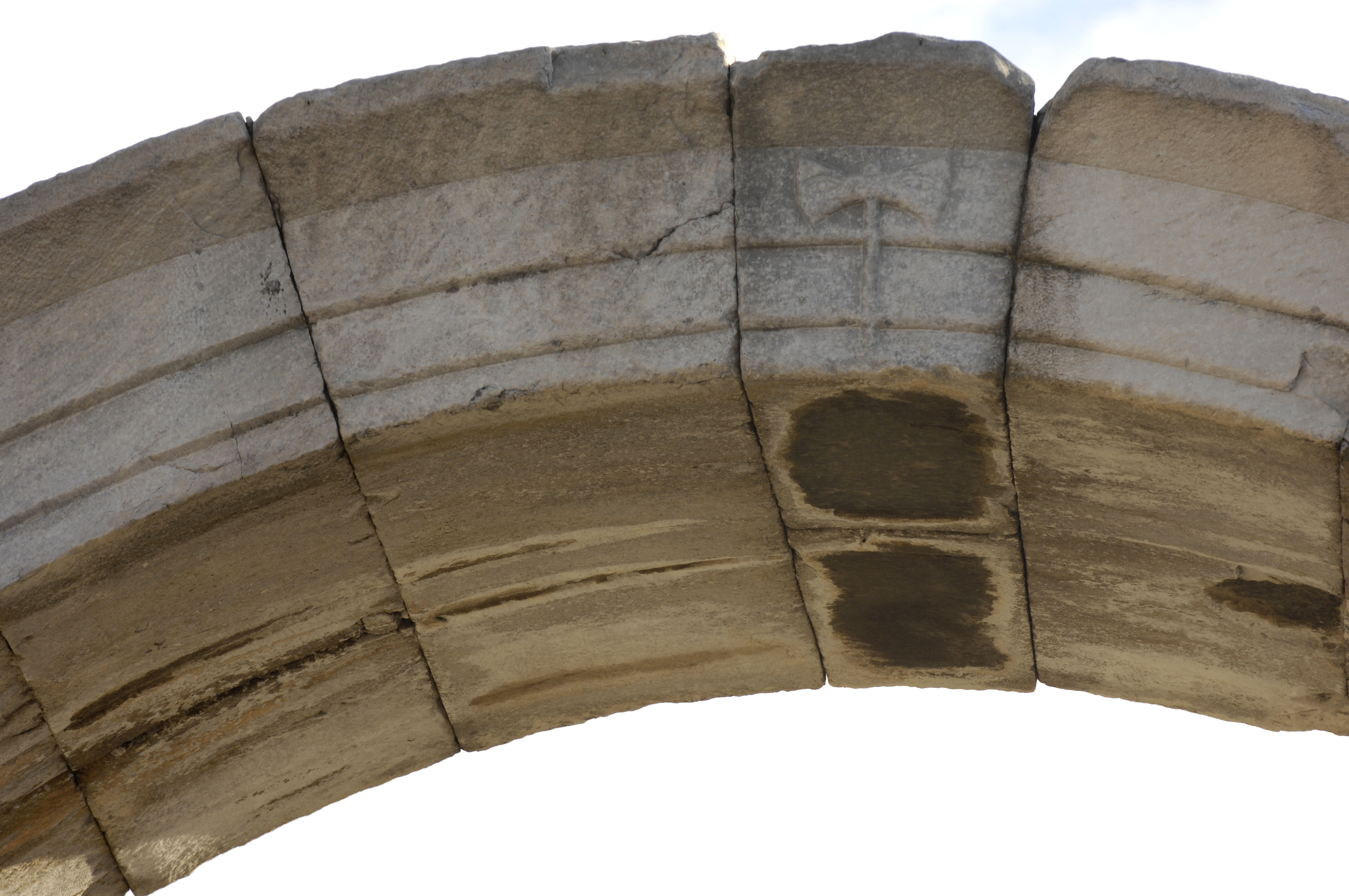
Milas Baltalı Kapı Axe

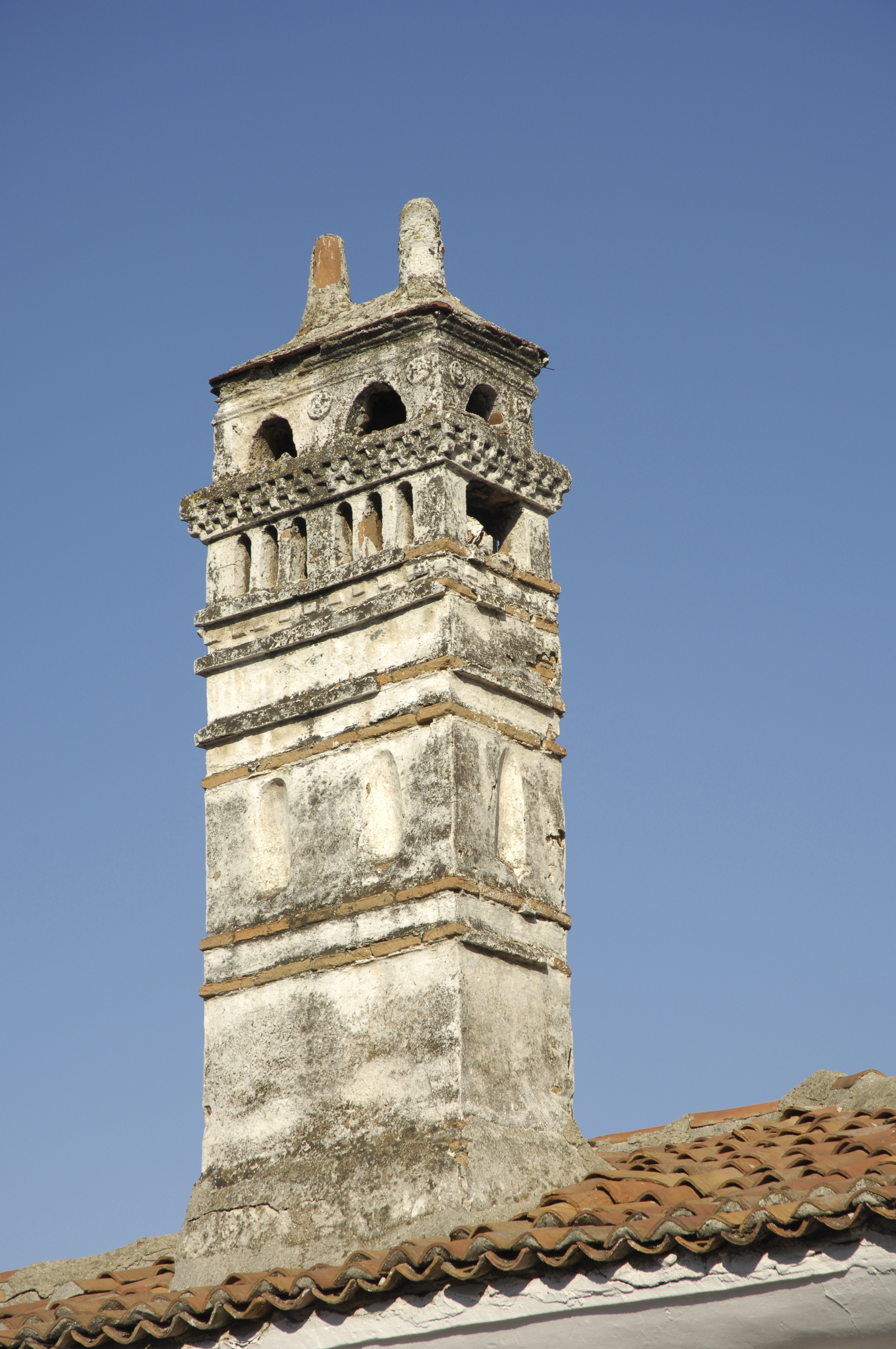
Typical chimneys of local style

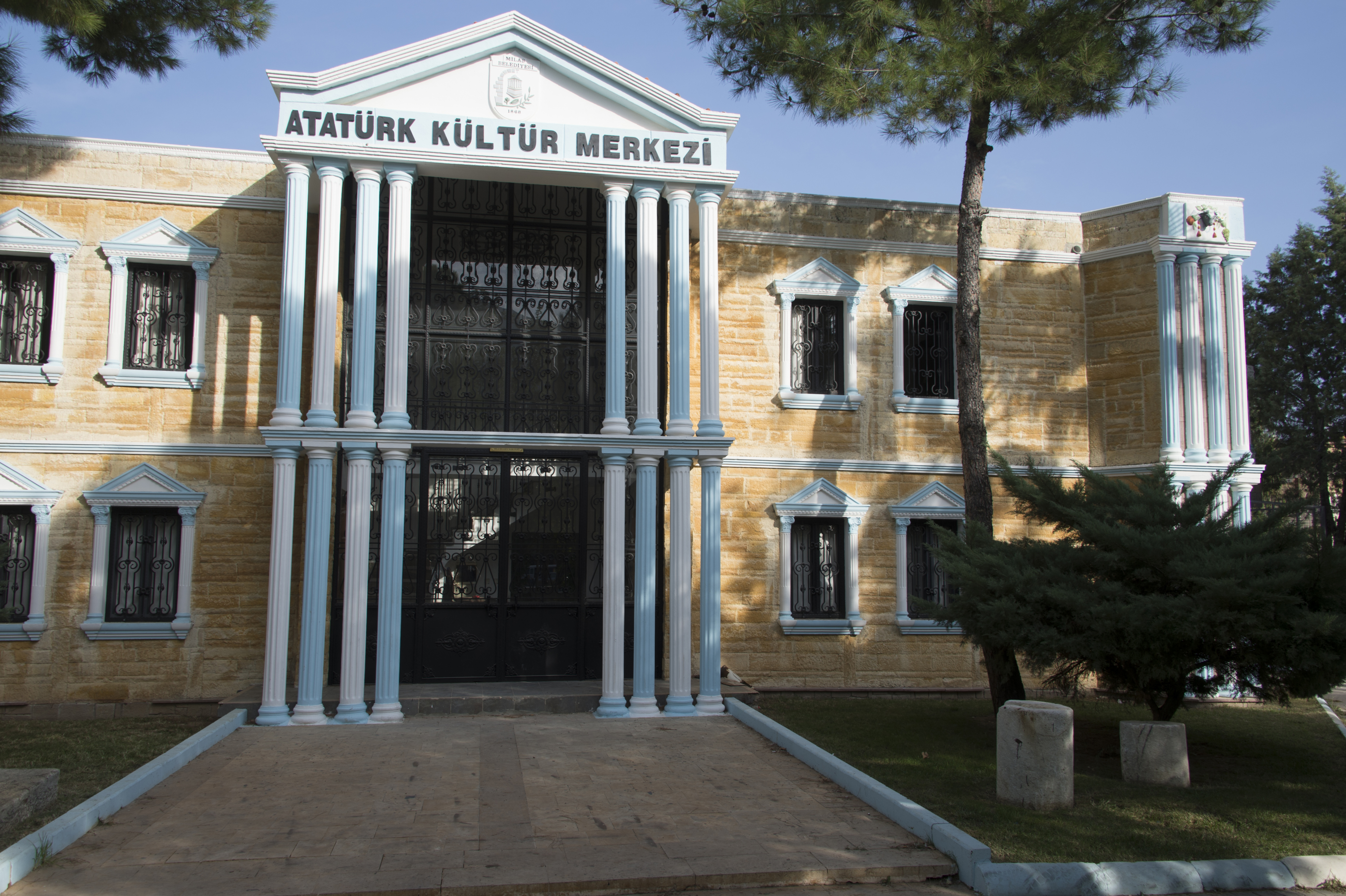
Milas Cultural Centre

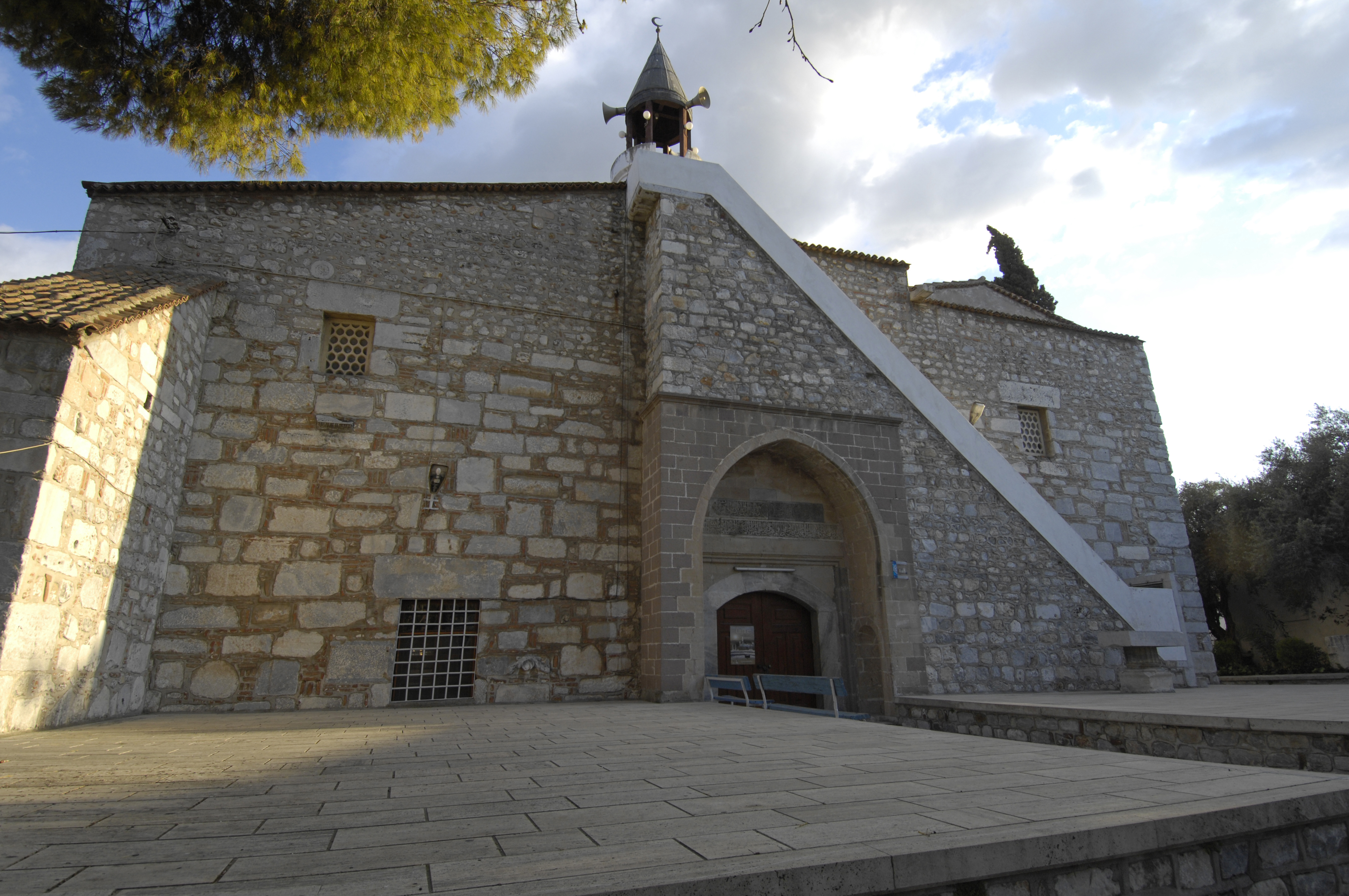
Milas Grand Mosque (Ulu Cami)

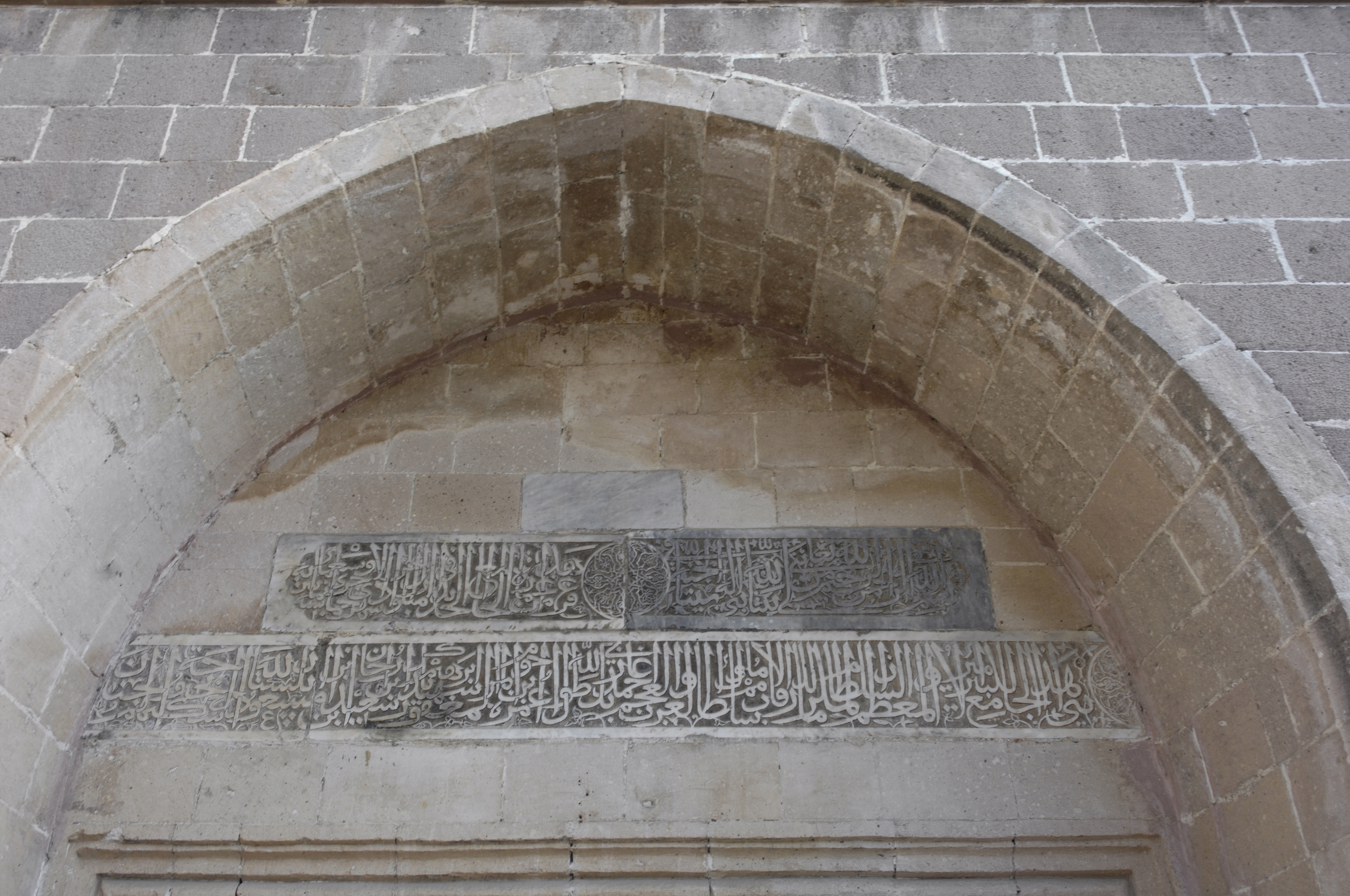
Milas Ulu Cami script above entrance - built by Ahmed Ghazi Bey

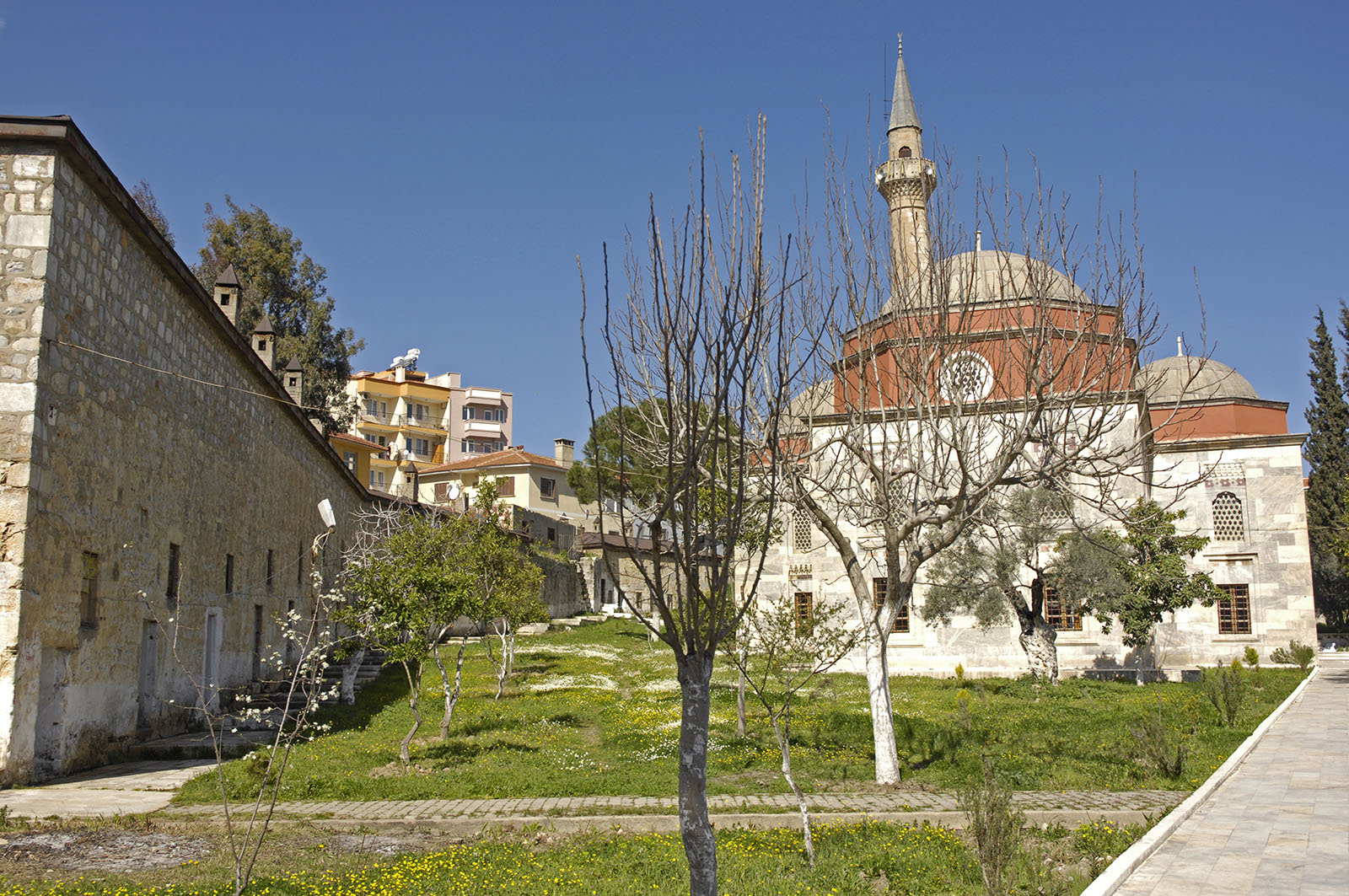
Milas Firuz Paşa Camii From garden

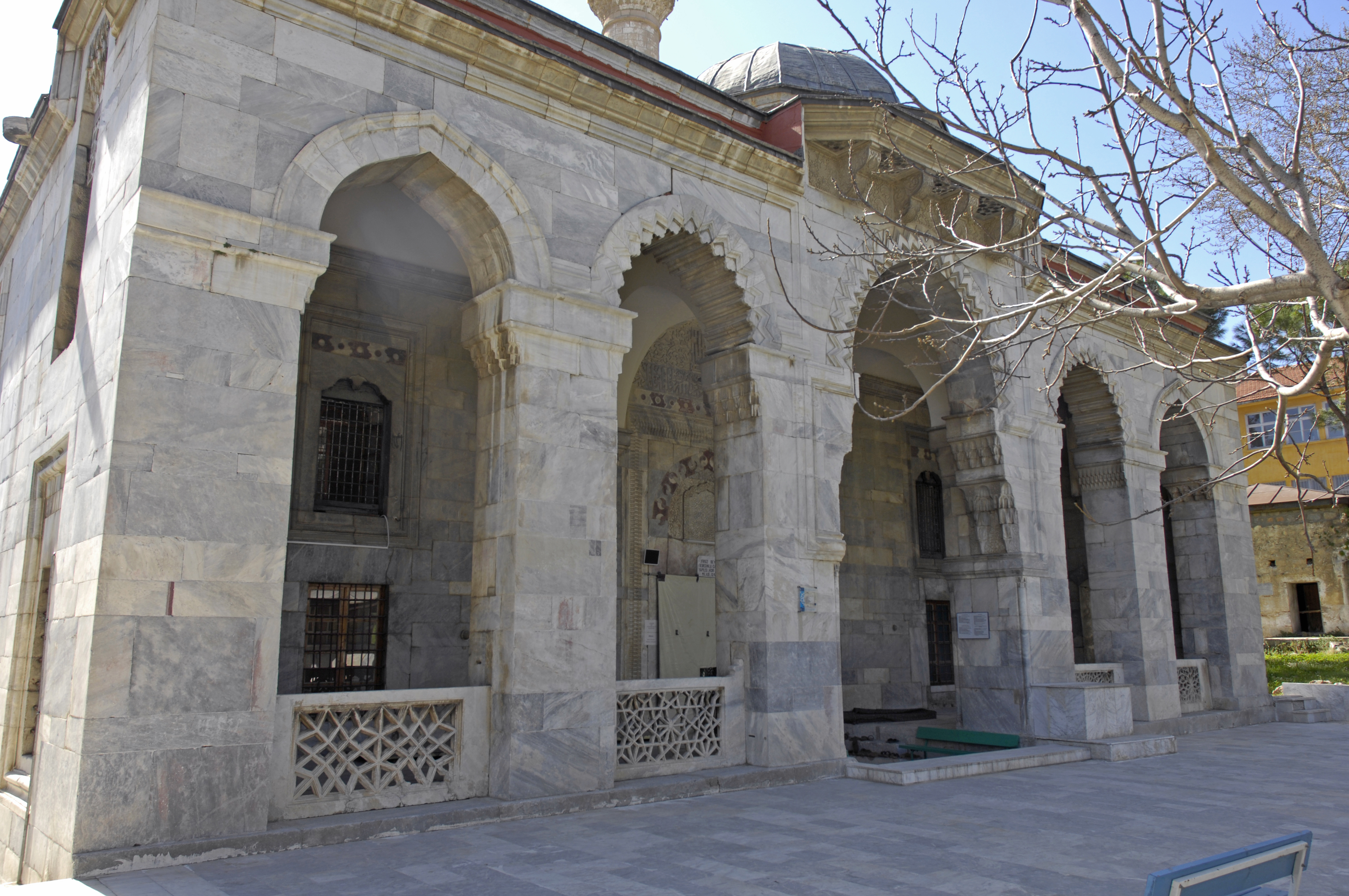
Milas Firuz Paşa Camii Front

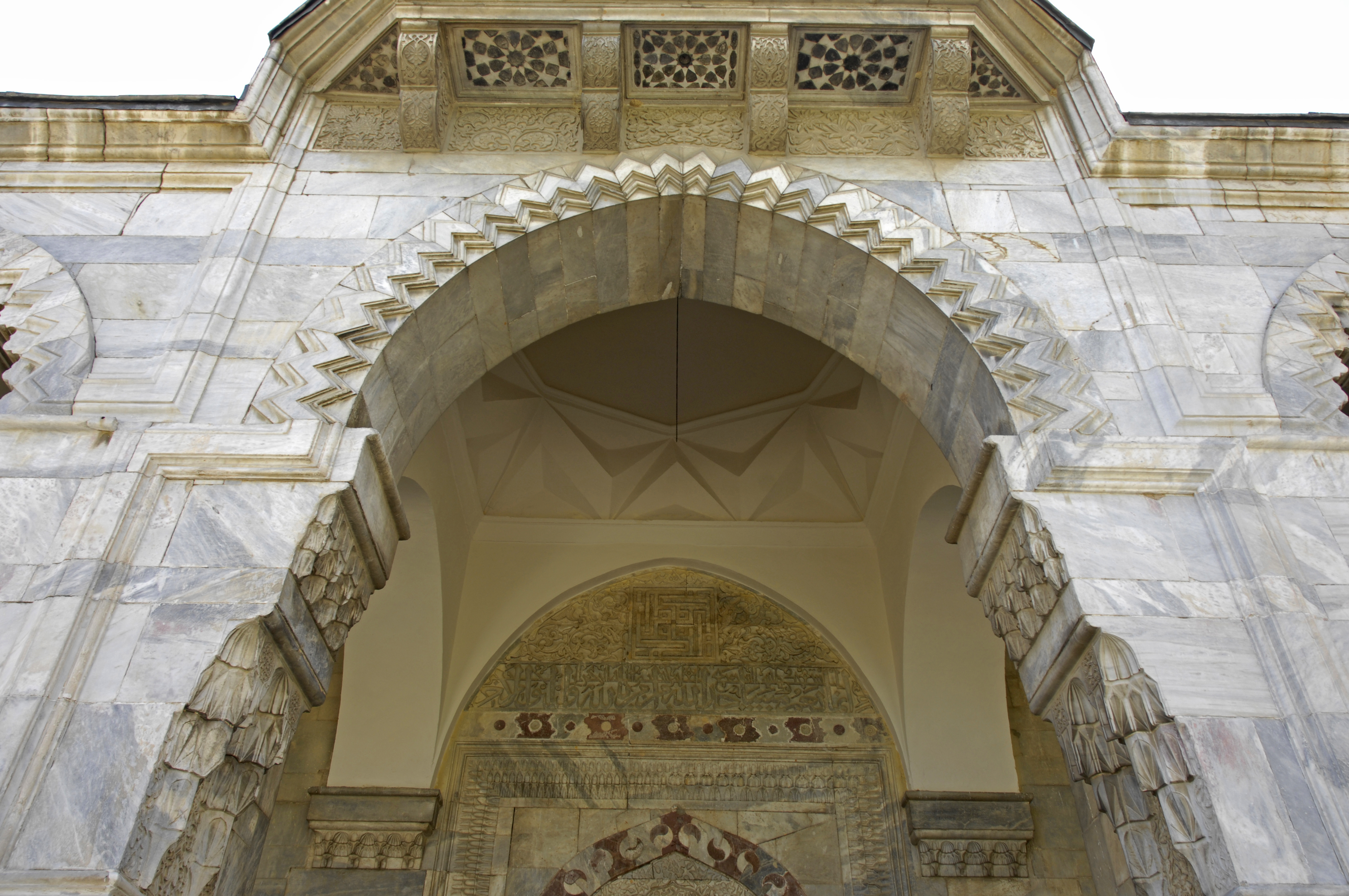
Milas Firuz Paşa Camii Main entrance

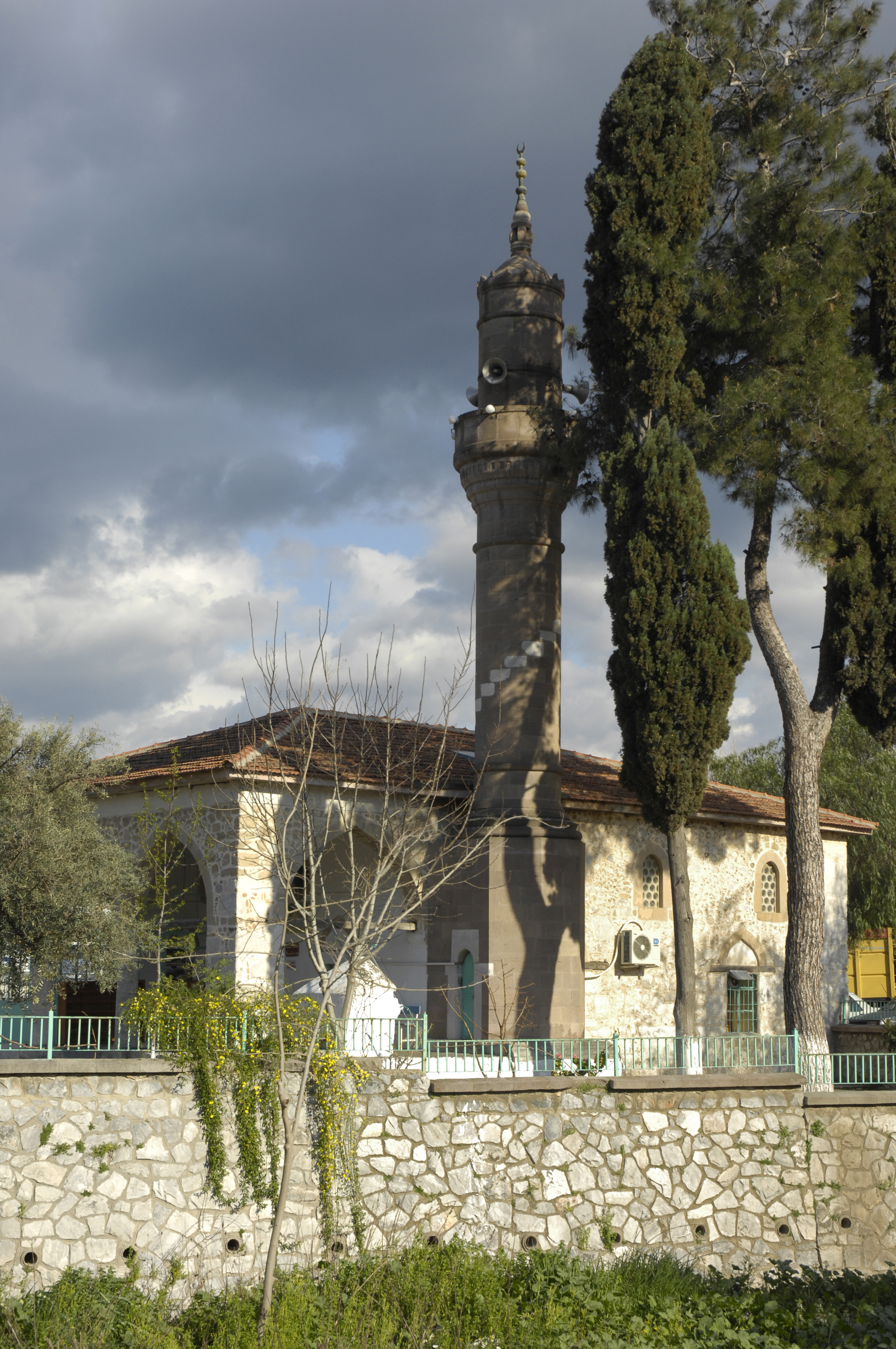
Milas Aga Mosque

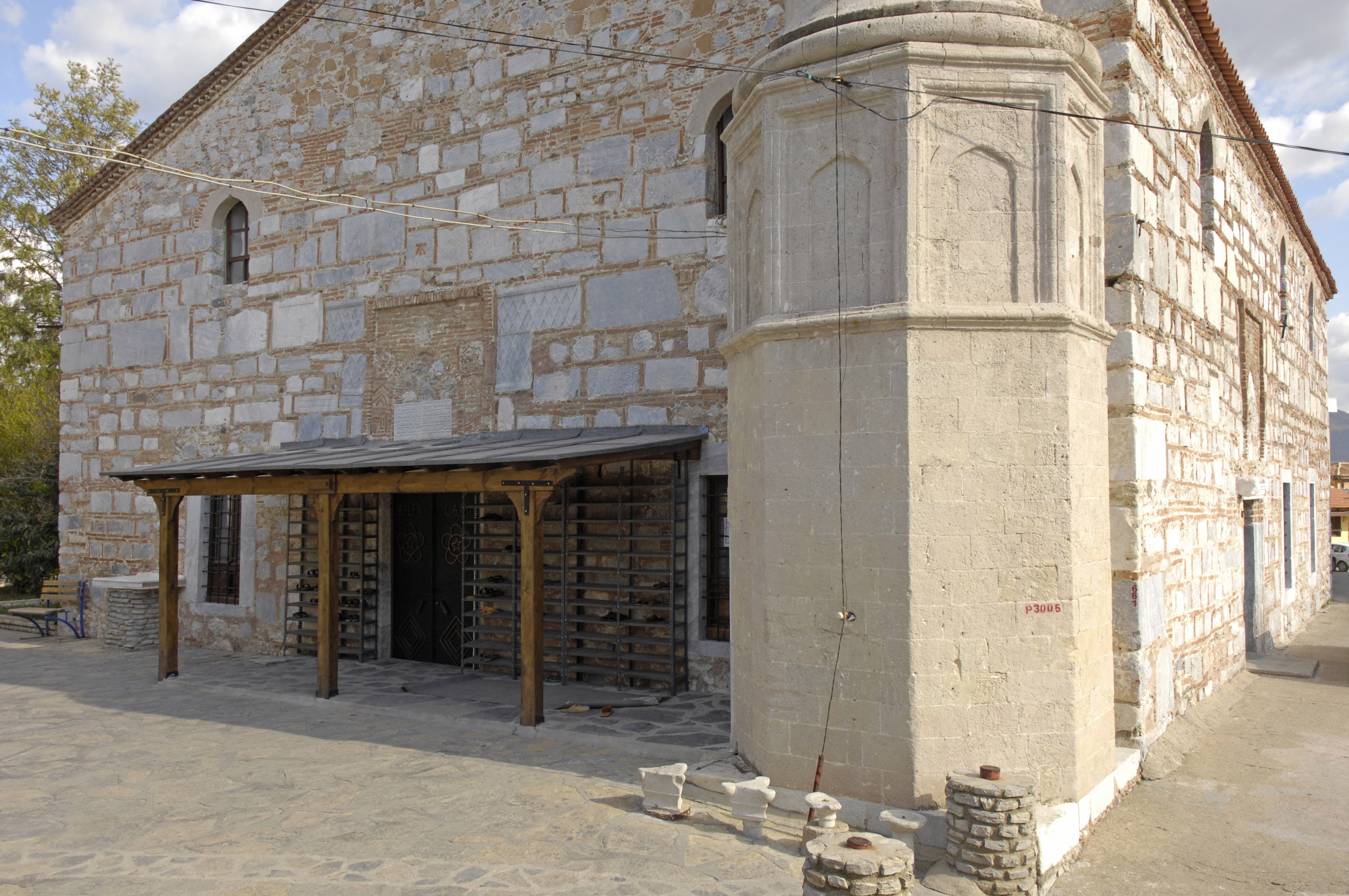
Milas Belen Camii

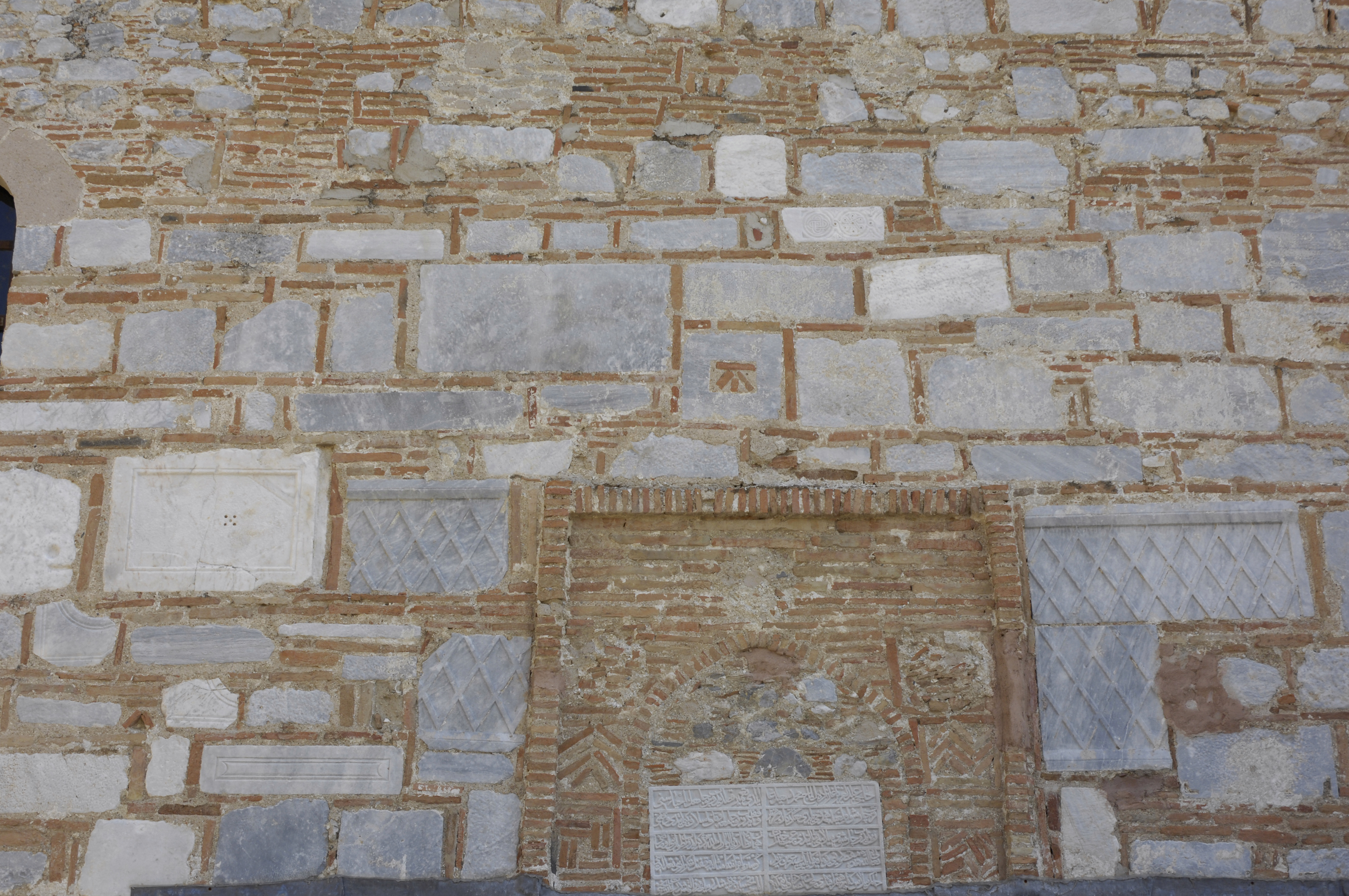
Milas Belen Camii Kitabe

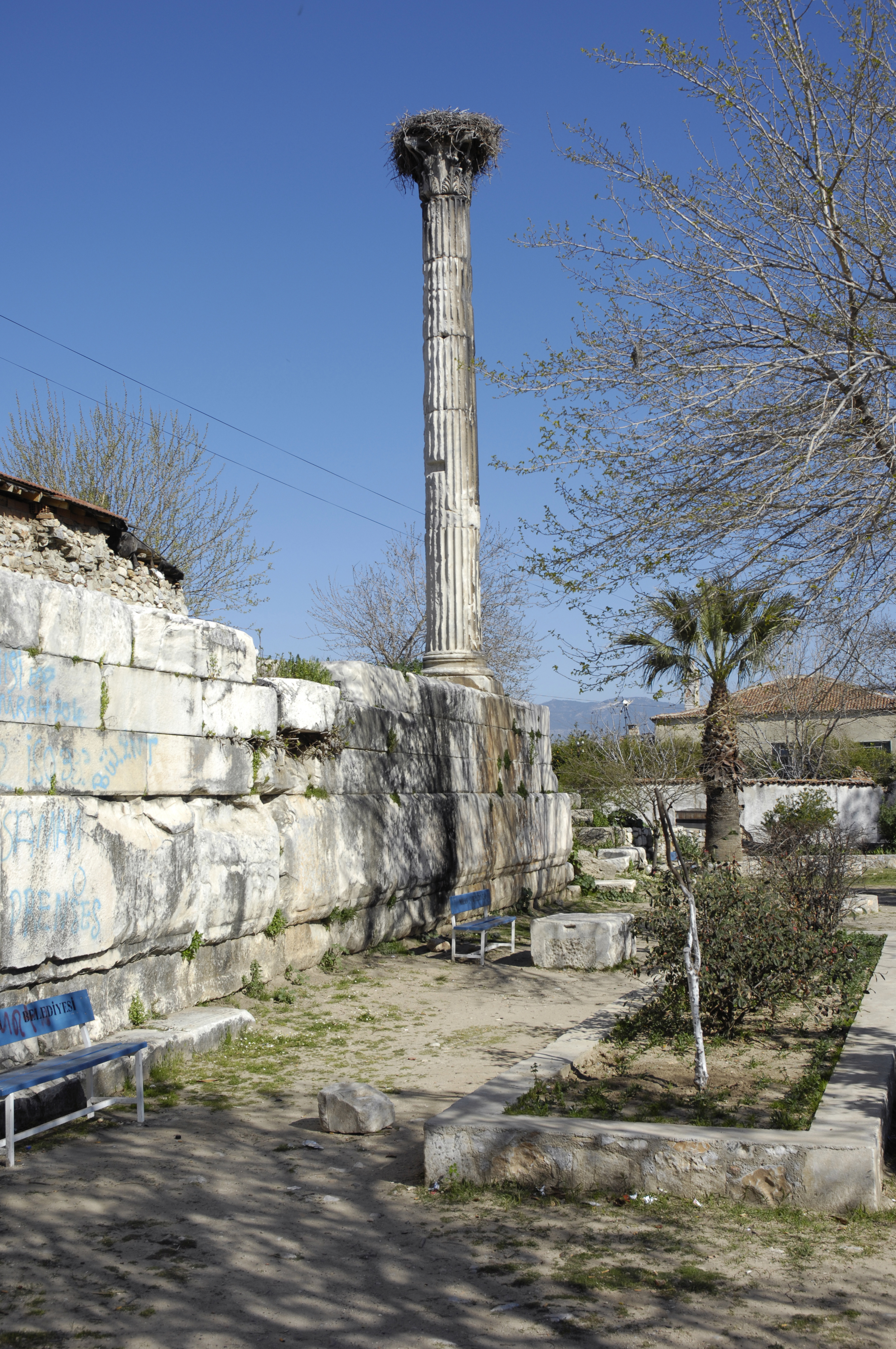
Milas Zeus Karios Temple

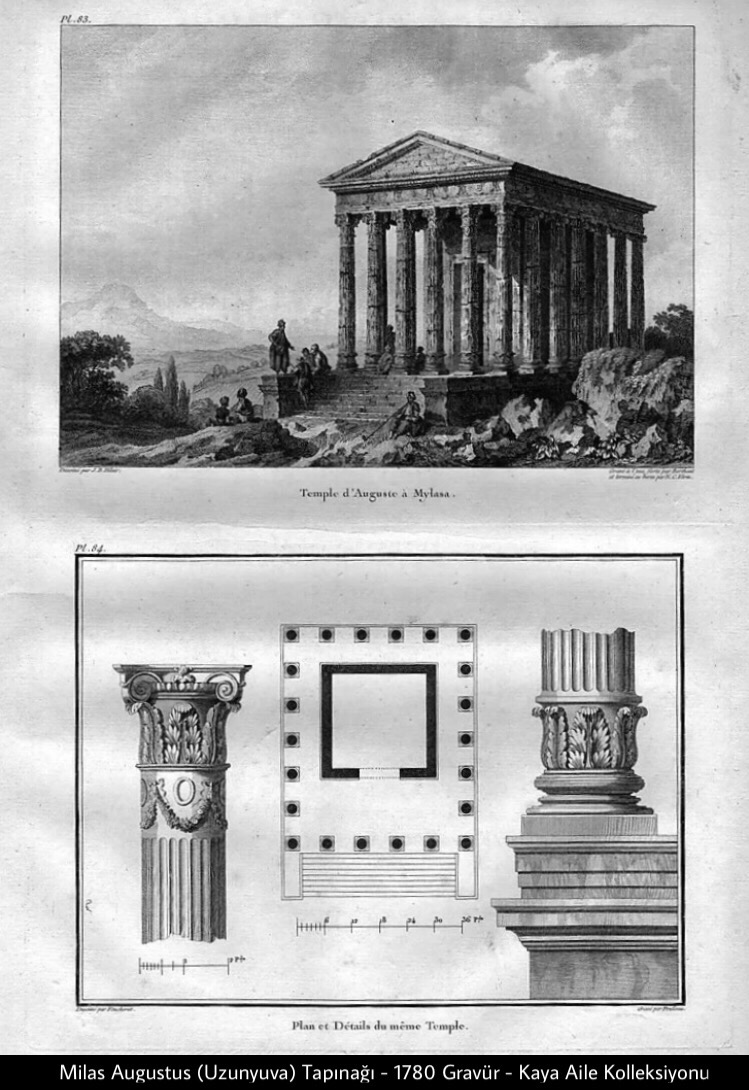
Temple of Augustus (Uzunyuva)

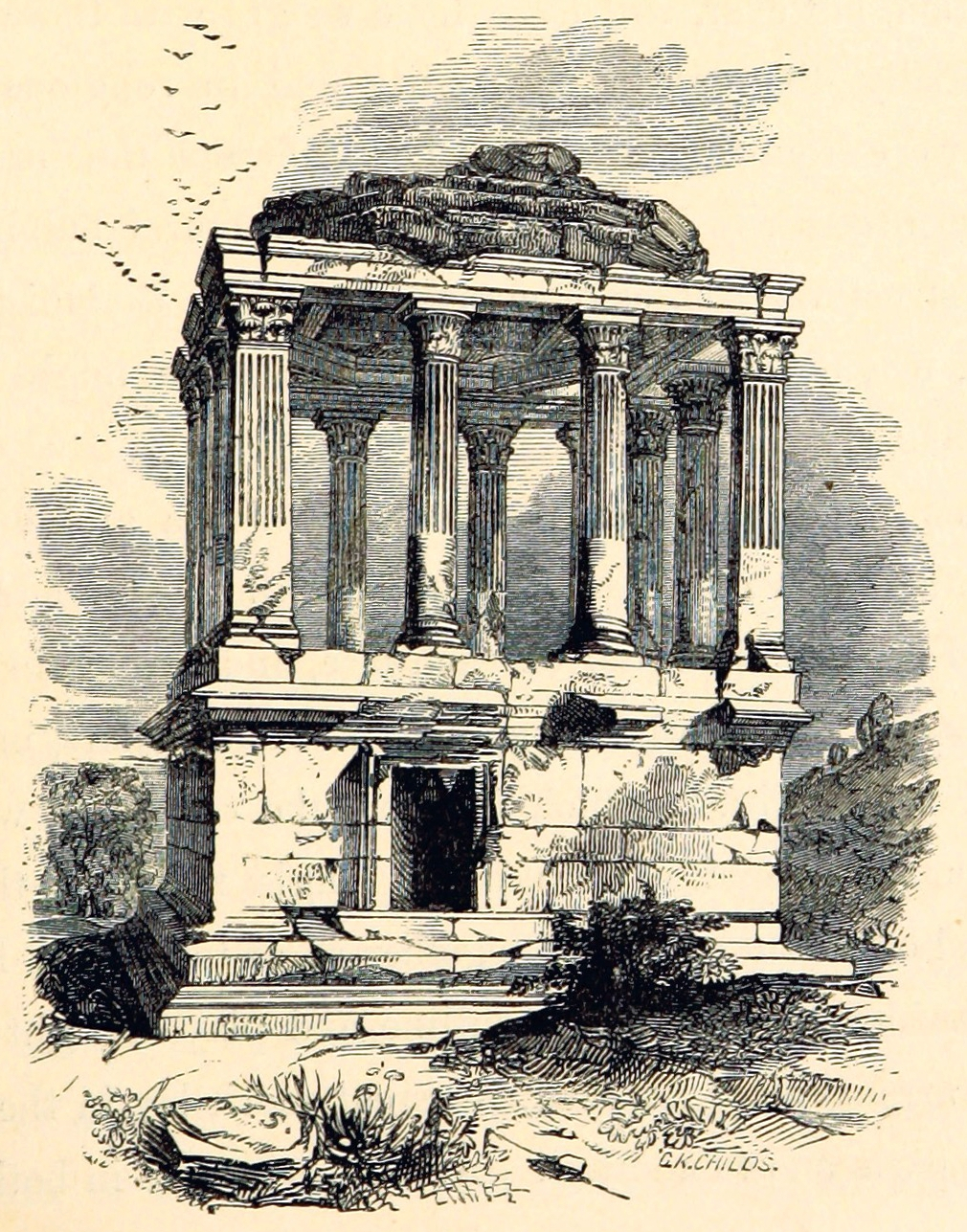
Sketch of Gümüşkesen, 1866

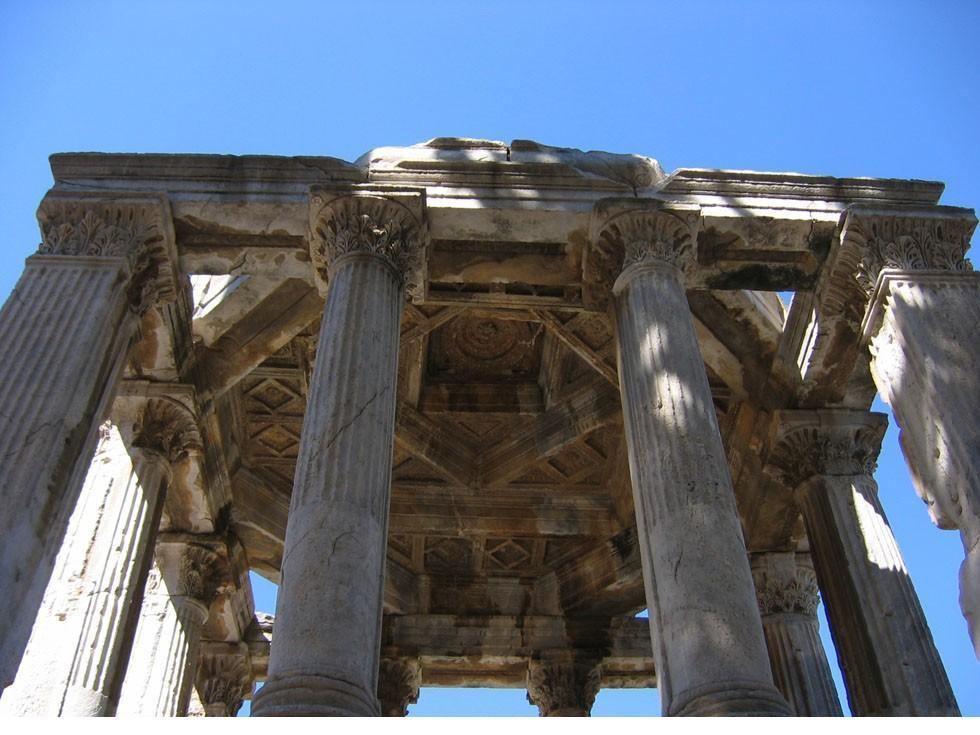
Gümüşkesen chambered tomb monument in Milas, built during the city's Roman Period and modelled on the Mausoleum of Mausolus

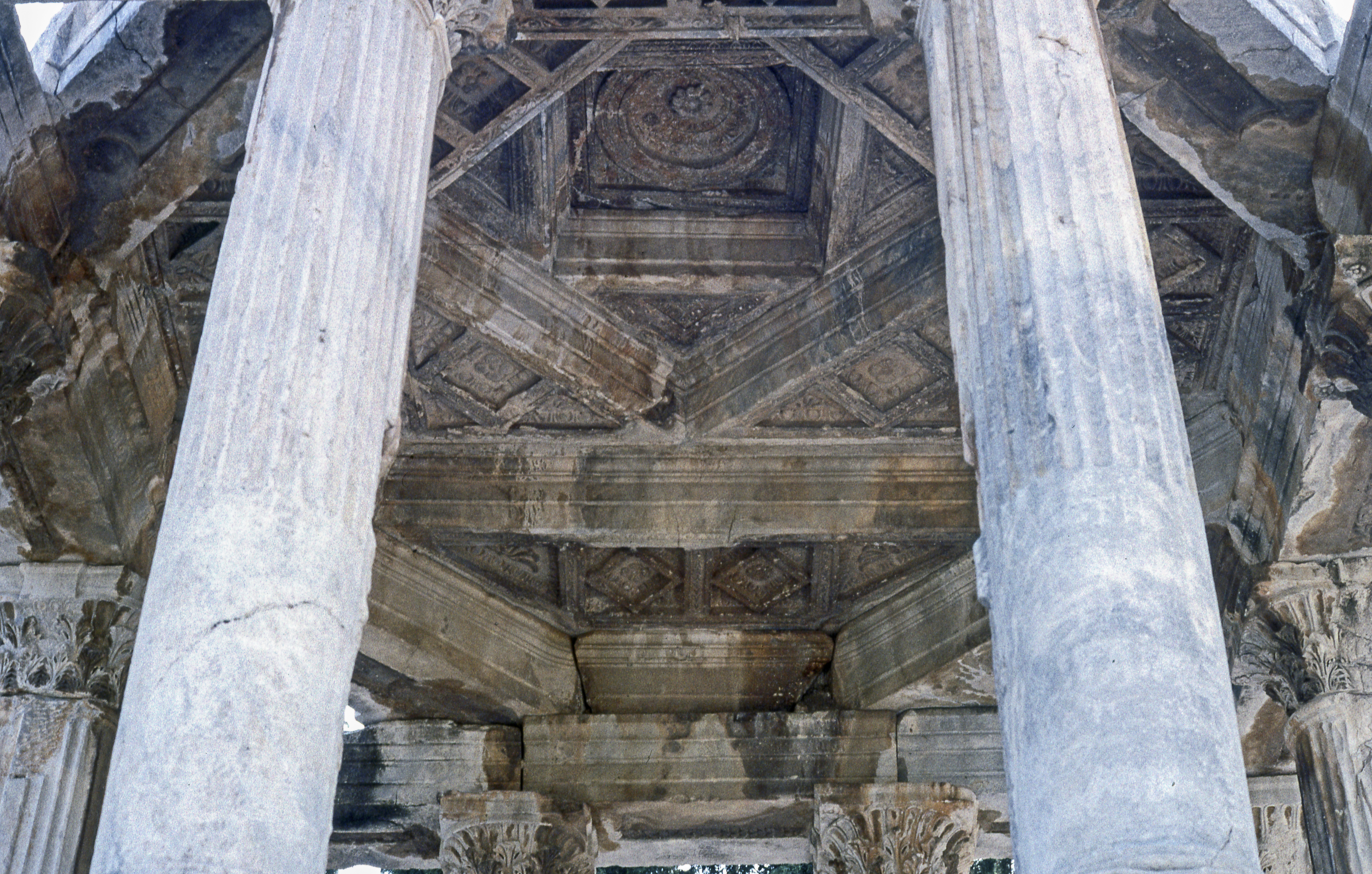
Gümüşkesen detail of ceiling

== See also ==
- Labranda
- Milas carpet
- Lake Bafa
- Milas–Bodrum Airport
- List of ancient Greek cities
