= Syangela =

Town of ancient Caria

Coordinates: 37°03′01″N 27°34′13″E

Syangela (Ancient Greek: Συάγγελα) was a town of ancient Caria. It was a polis (city-state) and a member of the Delian League, appearing in tribute lists of ancient Athens. It, along with Myndus, avoided synoecism into Halicarnassus when Mausolus united other ancient cities into Halicarnassus.

Its site is located near Kaplan Dağ, Asiatic Turkey.
