= Alexander of Myndus =

Ancient Greek writer

Alexander (Ancient Greek: Ἀλέξανδρος) of Myndus in Caria was an ancient Greek writer who some believe lived during the 1st century AD but this date is uncertain. He wrote on diverse topics, including zoology and divination. His works, which are now lost, must have been considered very valuable by the ancients, since they refer to them very frequently; fragments of his work are preserved in various later authors.

The titles of Alexander's works are: A History of Beasts (Κτηνῶν Ἱστορία), a long fragment of which, belonging to the second book, is quoted by Athenaeus. This work is probably the same as that which in other passages is called On Animals (Περὶ Ζώων), and of which Athenaeus likewise quotes the second book. The treatise On Birds (Περὶ Πτηνῶν) was a separate work, and the second book of it is quoted by Athenaeus. Diogenes Laërtius mentions one "Alexon of Myndus" as the author of a work on myths, of which he quotes the ninth book. This author being otherwise unknown, the French scholar Gilles Ménage proposed to read "Alexander" instead of "Alexon". But everything is uncertain, and the conjecture is thought by other scholars to be improbable.

It is possible that the illustrations of birds in the Vienna Dioscurides, which appear to be based on illustrations from an older, different treatise, as they don't relate directly to the treatise they illustrate, are derived from illustrations from the lost treatise on birds of Alexander.

== Sources ==
- Darius Del Corno, Graecorum de re Onirocritica Scriptorum Reliquiae (1969) no. 14.
- Oder, "Das Traumbuch des Alexander von Myndos," RhM 45 (1890) pp. 637–639.
- Alexander of Myndus from Smith's Dictionary of Greek and Roman Biography and Mythology (1867).
- Alexander of Myndos from Greek and Roman Science and Technology by T E Rihll.
