= Caryanda =

Ancient Greek city

Coordinates: 37°07′35″N 27°22′41″E

Location of Caryanda, modern Turkey

Caryanda (Note: /kɑːriːˈɑːndə/ kar-ee-AHN-duh) or Karyanda (Ancient Greek: Καρυάνδα) was a city on the coast of ancient Caria in southwestern Anatolia. Stephanus of Byzantium describes it as a city and harbour (λίμην) near Myndus and Cos. But λιμήν, in the text of Stephanus, is an emendation or alteration: the manuscripts use the word λίμνη ('lake'). Strabo places Caryanda between Myndus and Bargylia, and he describes it, according to the common text, as "a lake, and island of the same name with it;" and thus the texts of Stephanus, who derived his information from Strabo, agree with the texts of Strabo. Pliny simply mentions the island Caryanda with a town; but he is in that passage only enumerating islands. In another passage he mentions Caryanda as a place on the mainland, and Pomponius Mela does so too. Scylax of Caryanda, one of the most famous mariners and explorers of ancient times, was a native of Caryanda. He lived in the late 6th and early 5th centuries BC and served the Persian king Darius I.

Originally, Caryanda was located on an island of the same name, approximately 19 km north of the Dorian Greek city of Halicarnassus, the dominant city of the peninsula. Later Caryanda was relocated to a site on a bay on the north coast of the Bodrum Peninsula near Göl, in what is today the Turkish tourist resort town of Türkbükü. There it was known as (Caryanda) Neapolis.

Caryanda was a member of the Athenian dominated Delian League during the 5th century BC.
