= Pisilis =

Town of ancient Caria

Coordinates: 36°42′11″N 28°41′52″E

Pisilis (Ancient Greek: Πίσιλις), also known as Panormus or Panormos (Πάνορμος), was a small port town of ancient Caria, between Calynda and Kaunos.

Its site is located within Sarıgerme beach near the modern Babadağ.
