= Side (Caria) =

Ancient town in Caria

Coordinates: 37°14′00″N 27°50′59″E

Side (Ancient Greek: Σίδη). also known as Sibde (Σίβδη), was a town of ancient Caria. According to Pliny the Elder, Alexander the Great united in Halicarnassus six cities by synoecism, including Side, next to Theangela, Medmasa, Uranium, Pedasa, and Telmissus. Strabo, however, points out that this synoecism would have been carried out earlier, during the reign of Mausolus (c. 370 BCE).

Its site is tentatively located near Alazeytin, Turkey.
