= Palaemyndus =

Town of ancient Caria

Coordinates: 37°01′53″N 27°15′33″E

Palaemyndus or Palaia Myndos (Ancient Greek: Παλαιάμυνδος or Παλαιὰ Μύνδος) was a town of ancient Caria, near Myndus, which was its successor settlement. Palaemyndus seems to have been the ancient place of the Carians which became deserted after the establishment of the Dorian Myndus.

Its site is located near Bozdağ, Asiatic Turkey.
