= İkiz Islands =

Twin islands in Turkey

İkiz ıslands
Native name: İkiz Adalar
- Location within Turkey

Geography
- Coordinates: 37°7′31″N 27°28′40″E

Administration
- Turkey
- İl (province): Muğla Province
- İlçe: Bodrum

İkiz Islands (Turkish: İkizadalar, literally "Twin Islands") are two small Aegean islands of Turkey. They are in Gulf of Güllük. Administratively they are a part of Bodrum ilçe (district) of Muğla Province. According to map page, the island to the north east is situated at 37°7′31″N 27°28′40″E. The other island is only 270 metres (890 ft) away. They are to the south west of Salih Island. The length of the northern island is 650 metres (2,130 ft) and the southern island is 750 metres (2,460 ft). The nearest point of the main land (Anatolia) is more than 2.5 kilometres (1.6 mi) away.
