= Neapolis (Caria) =

Town of ancient Caria

Coordinates: 37°07′35″N 27°22′41″E

Neapolis (Ancient Greek: Νεάπολις) or Caryanda Neapolis (Karyanda Neapolis) (Ancient Greek: Καρυάνδα Νεάπολις) was a coastal town of ancient Caria. It was located near ancient Myndus and modern Göl. Neapolis was successor of Caryanda, when it was moved early in the 3d century.
