= Astragon (Caria) =

Ancient town in Turkey

Coordinates: 37°22′54″N 28°13′03″E

Astragon was a town of ancient Caria in the territory of Stratonicea. It was a point of contest between the Rhodians and Macedonians in their war (c. 190 BCE).

Its site is tentatively located near Elmacık, Asiatic Turkey.
