= Madnasa =

Ancient Greek archaeological site in Turkey

- Location within Turkey
- 37°7′43″N 27°23′21″E
- Type: settlement
- Location: Türkbükü Bay, Turkey

History
- Built: Archaic Period

Madnasa (Ancient Greek: Μάδνασα), or Medmasa (Μέδμασα), also known as Medmasus or Medmasos (Μέδμασος), was a town in ancient Caria, at the Myndos Peninsula, and is currently an archaeological site near upper Göl, about 13 km northeast of Myndos. In 5th century BCE the city was included in the Delian League and Athenian tribute lists.

== Literature ==
Pliny the Elder (5.107) calls the city Medmasa, reporting that with five more Lelegian settlements was assigned by Alexander the Great to the jurisdiction of Halicarnassus. In fact their incorporation into Halicarnassus is credited to the Carian satrap Mausolus in 4th century BCE. The city is quoted by Stephanos Byzantios in the geographical lexicon Ethnika from Hekataios's fragmenta, where it seems that the city had the archaic name Kurbasa.

The earliest reference to the city comes from the description of three Carian sites by W.R., Paton, J.L. Myres, & E.L. Hicks at 1894. Later, Bean identified the city with the visible ruins on the hill above Türkbükü Bay and lower Göl.

== The archaeological site ==
The site at Göl is referred 300 by 90 m, with a wall of polygonal masonry and at the highest point there is an ashlar tower. Cisterns and numerous house foundations are still visible. A group of tombs was cut into the rock-face at the west end of the site. Ostraka are dated to 5th and early 4th century BCE.
