= Pyrnus (Caria) =

Town of ancient Caria

Coordinates: 36°53′06″N 28°26′44″E

Pyrnus or Pyrnos (Ancient Greek: Πύρνος) was a coastal polis (city-state) of ancient Caria in the Rhodian Peraia. It was a member of the Delian League.

Its site is located near Büyükkaraağaç, Muğla Province, Turkey.
