= Apollonius of Myndus =

Ancient Greek astronomer

Apollonius of Myndus (Ancient Greek: Άπολλώνιος) lived at the time of Alexander the Great, that is, the 4th century BCE, and was particularly skilled in explaining horoscopes. He professed to have learned his art from the Chaldeans. His statements respecting the comets, which Seneca has preserved, that a comet is an individual heavenly body just like the sun and moon. Whether he is the same as Apollonius, a grammarian of Myndus, who is mentioned by Stephanus of Byzantium, is uncertain.
