= Tendeba =

Town of ancient Caria

Coordinates: 37°16′38″N 28°13′16″E

Tendeba was a town of ancient Caria in the territory of Stratonicea. It commanded a strong position and was a point of contest between the Rhodians and Macedonians in their war (c. 190 BCE)

Its site is tentatively located near Akgedik, Asiatic Turkey.
