= Loryma =

Ancient town in Asia Minor

Coordinates: 36°33′58″N 28°00′55″E

Loryma (Ancient Greek: τὰ Λόρυμα or Λώρυμα) was an ancient town and episcopal see of ancient Caria, in Asia Minor (Anatolia, Asian Turkey). It is now listed as a titular see. Loryma was a fortified place with a port, close to Cape Cynossema, on the westernmost point of the Rhodian Chersonesus, in Caria. Its harbour was about 20 Roman miles distant from Rhodes and was belonging to the Rhodians. Strabo applies the name Loryma to the whole of the rocky district, without mentioning the town. The Larumna of Pomponius Mela and the Lorimna of the Tabula Peutingeriana perhaps refer to Loryma, although it is also possible that they may be identical with a place called Larymna mentioned by Pliny in the same district.

== Location ==
Loryma was a small fortified town and harbour on the coast of Caria, not far from Cape Cynossema, at the western extremity of the peninsula known as Rhodian Chersonesus, opposite to and twenty Roman miles from Rhodes island. It was a fortified and was belonging to the Rhodians.

Its ruins, west of Port Aplothiki, with towers, tombs and ramparts are described by William Martin Leake (Asia Minor, 223). The site was later explored by the British antiquaries Theodore and Mabel Bent in March 1888.

Above the bay of Loryma (modern Bozuk Bükü) lie the ruins of a curtain wall surrounding the top of the hill. Constructed from large blocks of stone shaped in-situ, the remaining walls (up to several metres high on the outside) retain very precise corners and sheer faces.

== Ecclesiastical history ==
Up to the 12th and 13th centuries, the Notitiæ episcopatuum mention Loryma as one of the suffragan sees of the Stauropolis, the metropolitan see of Caria. Le Quien names three bishops of Loryma:

- George, present at the Council of Constantinople in 680
- Anthimus at the Second Council of Nicaea in 787
- Joseph at the Council of Constantinople in 879.

The see also exists as a titular see in the Catholic Church. Its bishops are:

- Antonio Laghi, O.F.M. (1715, appointed – 1727)
- Francesco Saraceni, O.F.M. (1728, appointed – 1742)
- Jan Krasiński (1748, appointed – 1760)
- Jan Szemiot (1760, appointed – 1762)
- Anthony Coyle (1777, appointed – 1782)
- Jan Nepomucen Kossakowski (1793, appointed – 1794)
- Georgius Połubiński (1796, appointed – 1801)
- Luis Gregorio López Castillo (1815, appointed – 1825)
- Vitaliano Provenzano (1839, appointed – 1857)
- Valentino Baranowski (1857, appointed – 1871)
- Stefano Pribék de Ville (1872, appointed – 1902)
- Francisco García y López (1903, appointed – 1909)
- George William Mundelein (1909, appointed – 1915)
- Adolf Józef Jełowicki (1918, appointed – 1937)
- Eugène Curien (1937, appointed – 1947)
- Vittorio Longo (1956, appointed – 1974)

== Literary reference ==
The British traveler and writer Freya Stark visited Loryma and wrote concerning the historical significance of its sheltered harbor:

In the stillness of Loryma we spent the night. The wind could be heard howling outside, against the hills that enclosed our sheltered water as if it were a mountain tarn. Only a fanning ripple touched the centre. The sound of the wind, inarticulate and busy like the world's voice, gave an illusion of safety, of an unassailable peace. If it could penetrate, how many sleeping echoes would it waken? Athenians from Samos, dodging the Dorian Cnidus, picking up ship's tackle at Syme, sheltering at Loryma; Conon, before the battle, with his ninety ships; the Roman fleet that dared not face Hannibal in the offing; Cassius, gathering forces against Rhodes, twenty miles away. Each in their turn passed through the narrow opening and felt the sudden calm. In these places, the natural features have remained unaltered; the moments that visit them, fashioned to one pattern by nature itself, drop like beads on a string, through long pauses, one after the other, into the same silence.

== Gallery ==
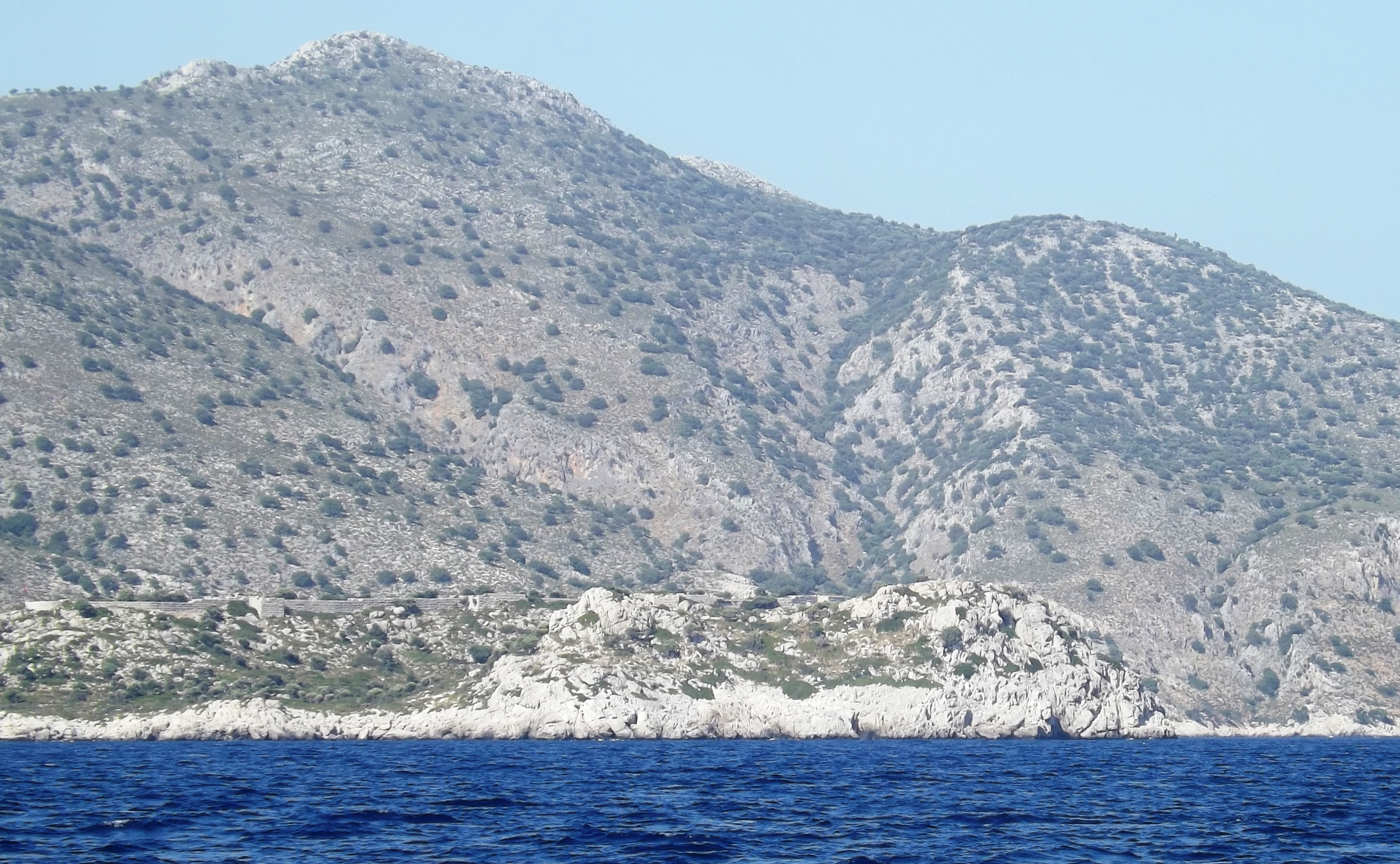

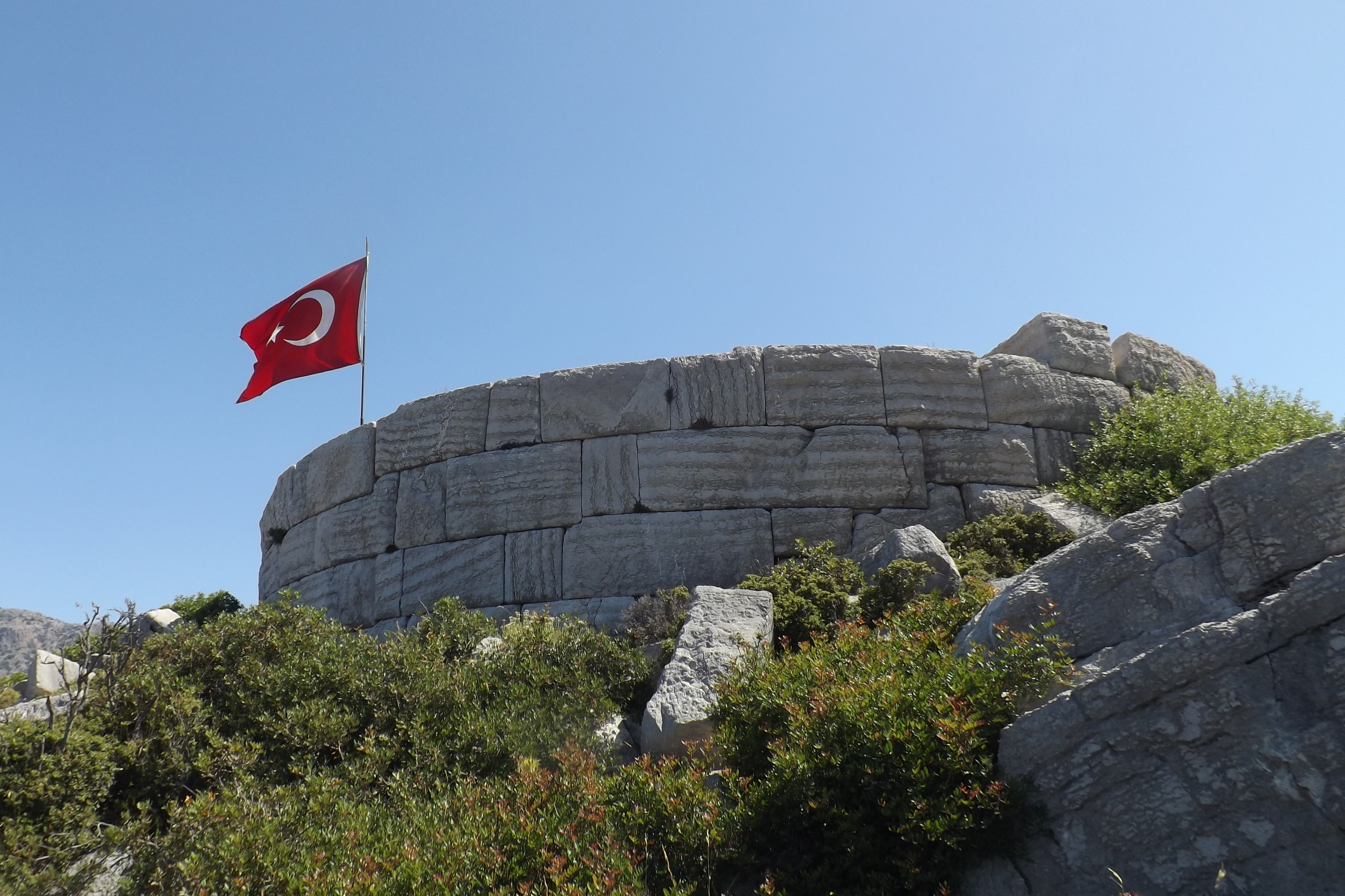

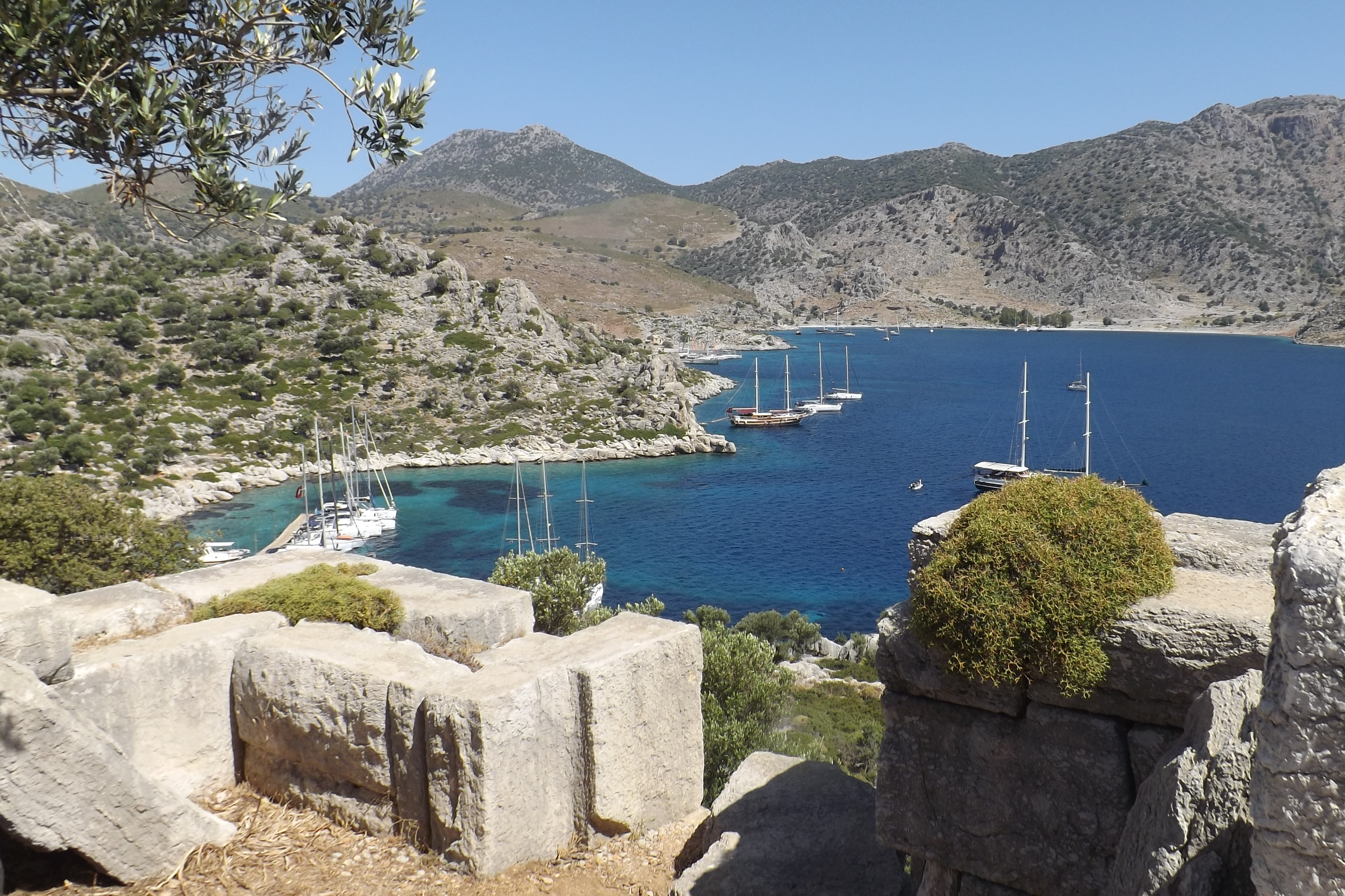

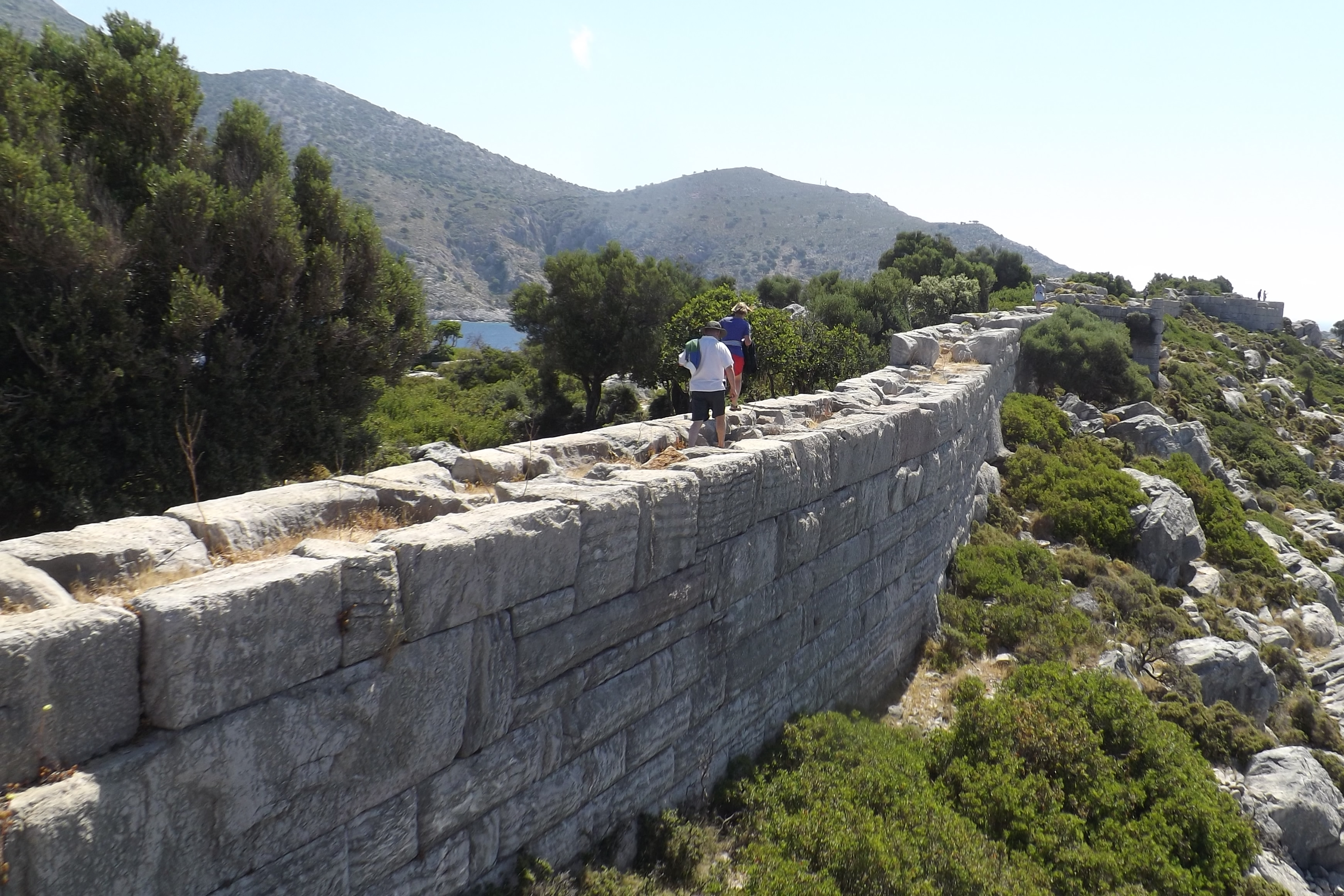
