= Milas Museum =

Archaeology and ethnography in Muğla Province, Turkey

- Milas Müzesi
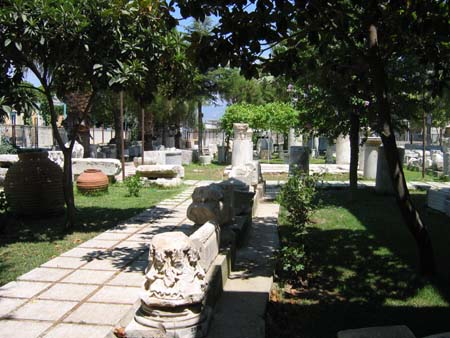
- Museum yard

- Location of Milas Museum in Turkey
- Established: 1987; 39 years ago
- Coordinates: 37°18′48″N 27°47′03″E
- Type: Archaeology, ethnographic
- Collections: Hellenistic period, Roman Empire, Byzantine Empire, Seljuk Empire, Ottoman Empire
- Collection size: 3,025 archaeological; 164 ethnographic; 1,174 coins
- Owner: Ministry of Culture and Tourism

Milas Museum (Turkish: Milas Müzesi) is a museum of archaeology and ethnography in Muğla Province of Turkey.

It is situated in Milas ilçe (district) of Muğla Province at 37°18′48″N 27°47′03″E. It was established in 1987. The museum is in a two-story building with a 1.5 decares (0.37 acres) yard. Most of the exhibited items are from Stratonicea, Iasos, Damlıboğaz (Hydai), and Beçin. The number of exhibited items are 3,025 archaeological items, 164 ethnographic items and 1,174 coins.

== Gallery ==
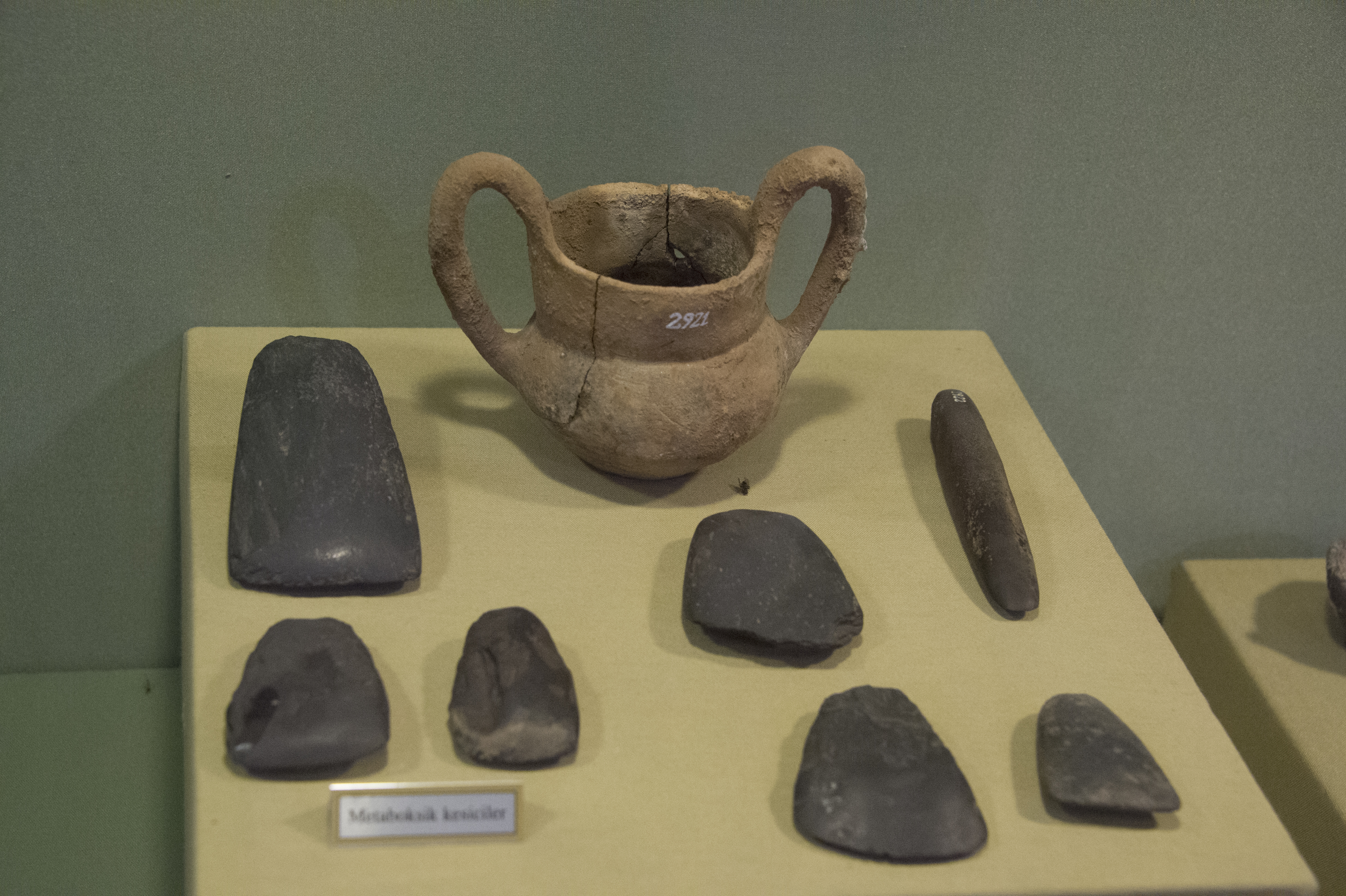
Milas Museum exhibits

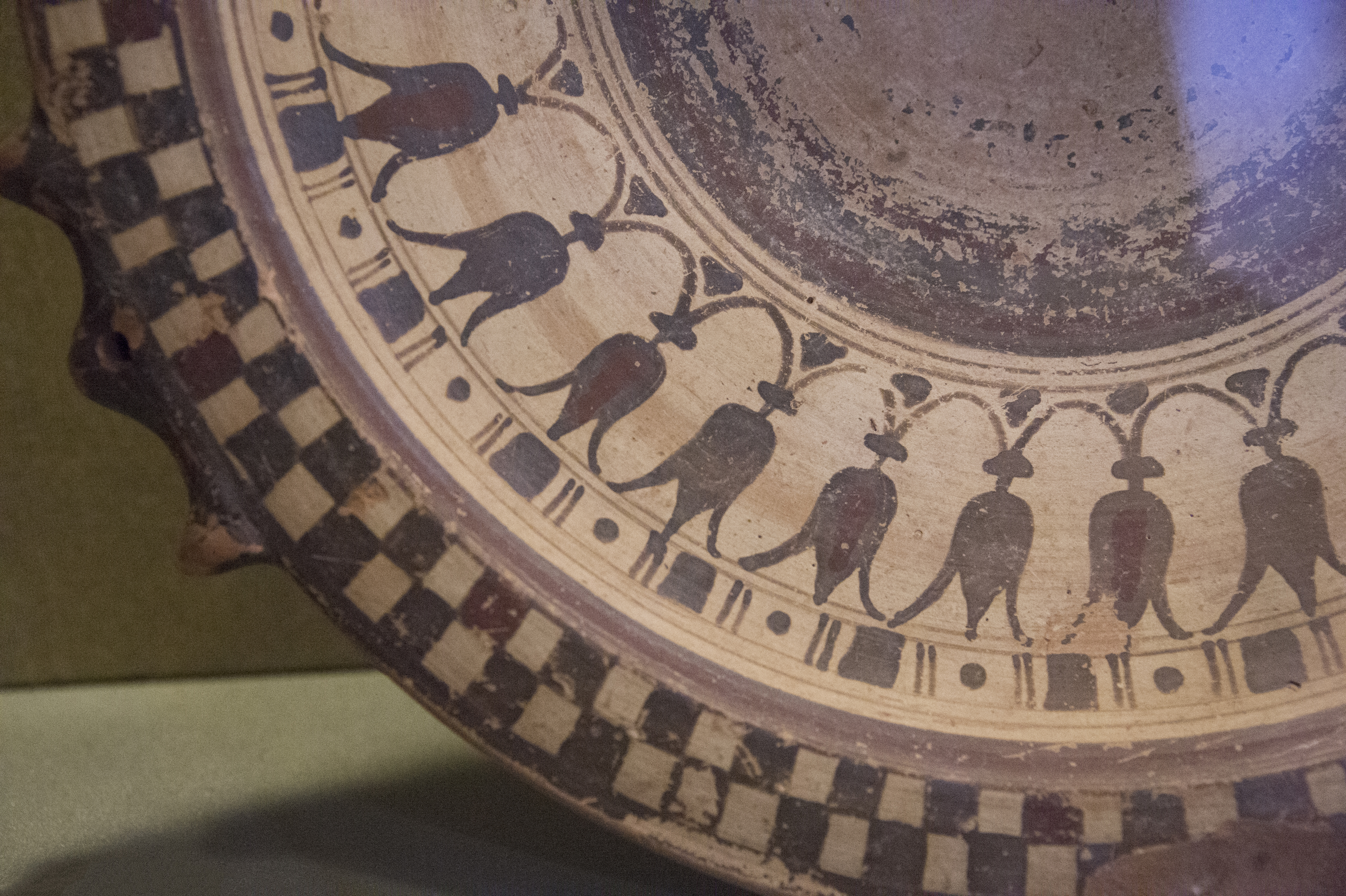
Milas Museum exhibits

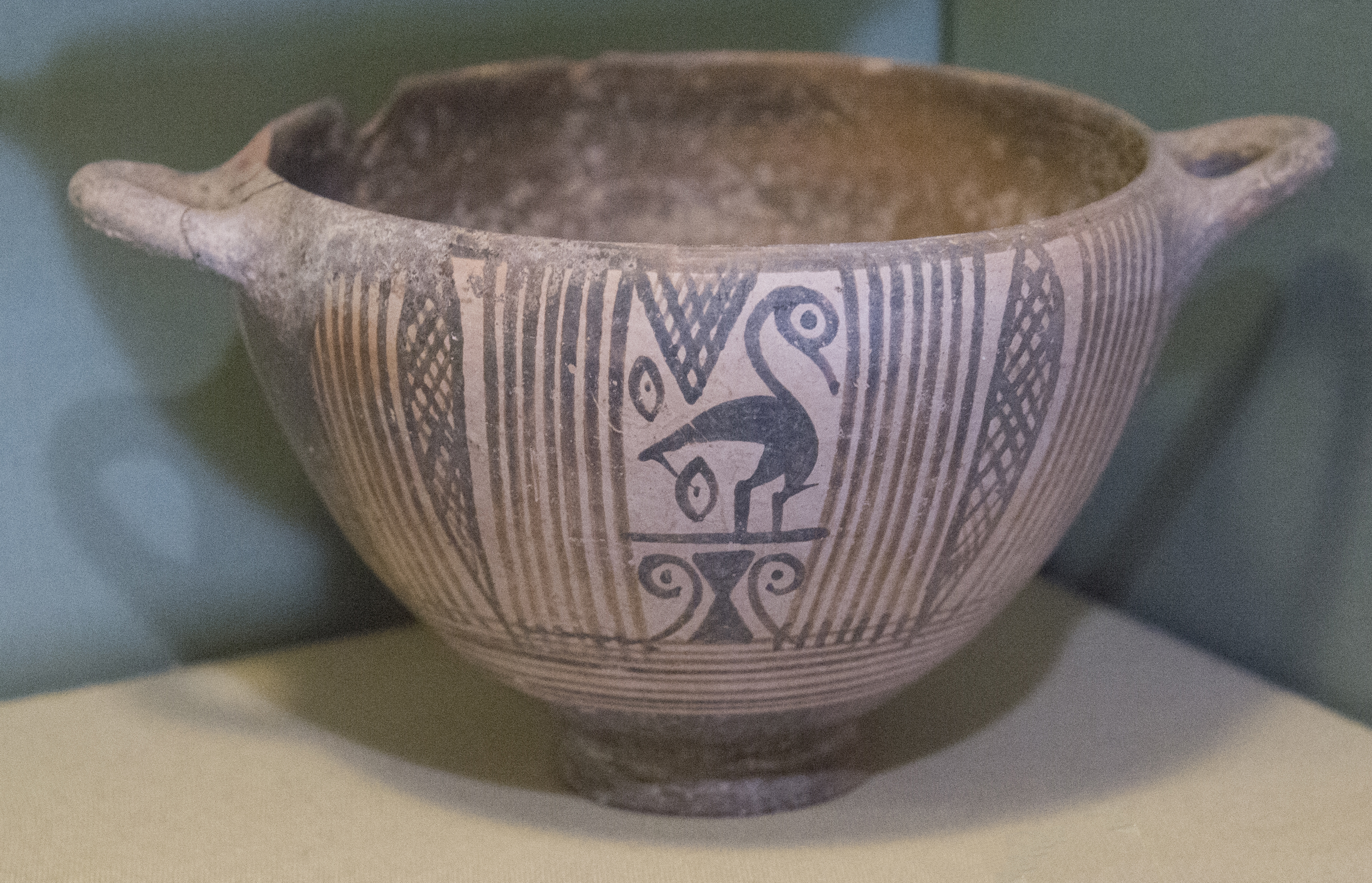
Milas Museum exhibits

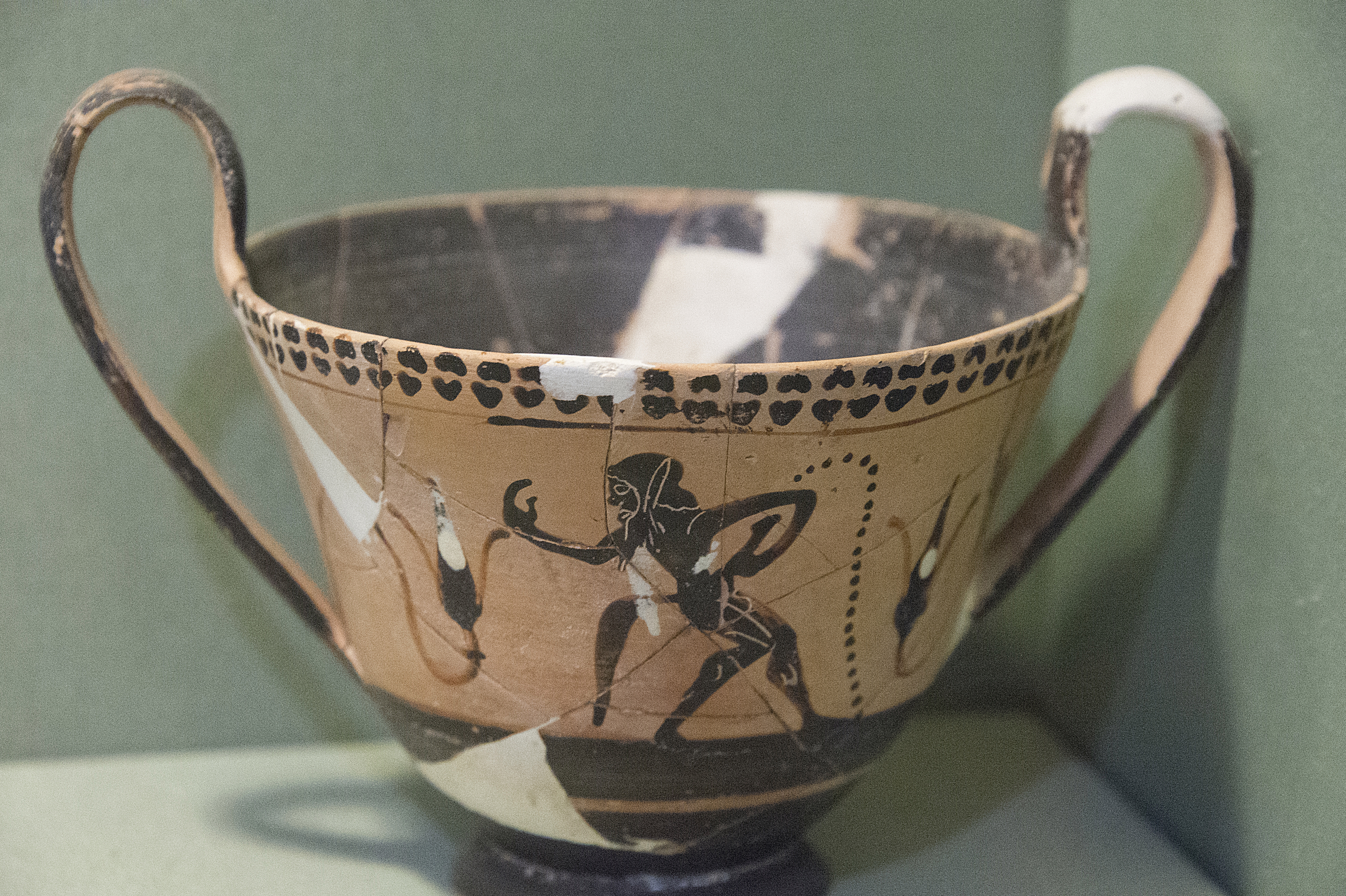
Milas Museum exhibits

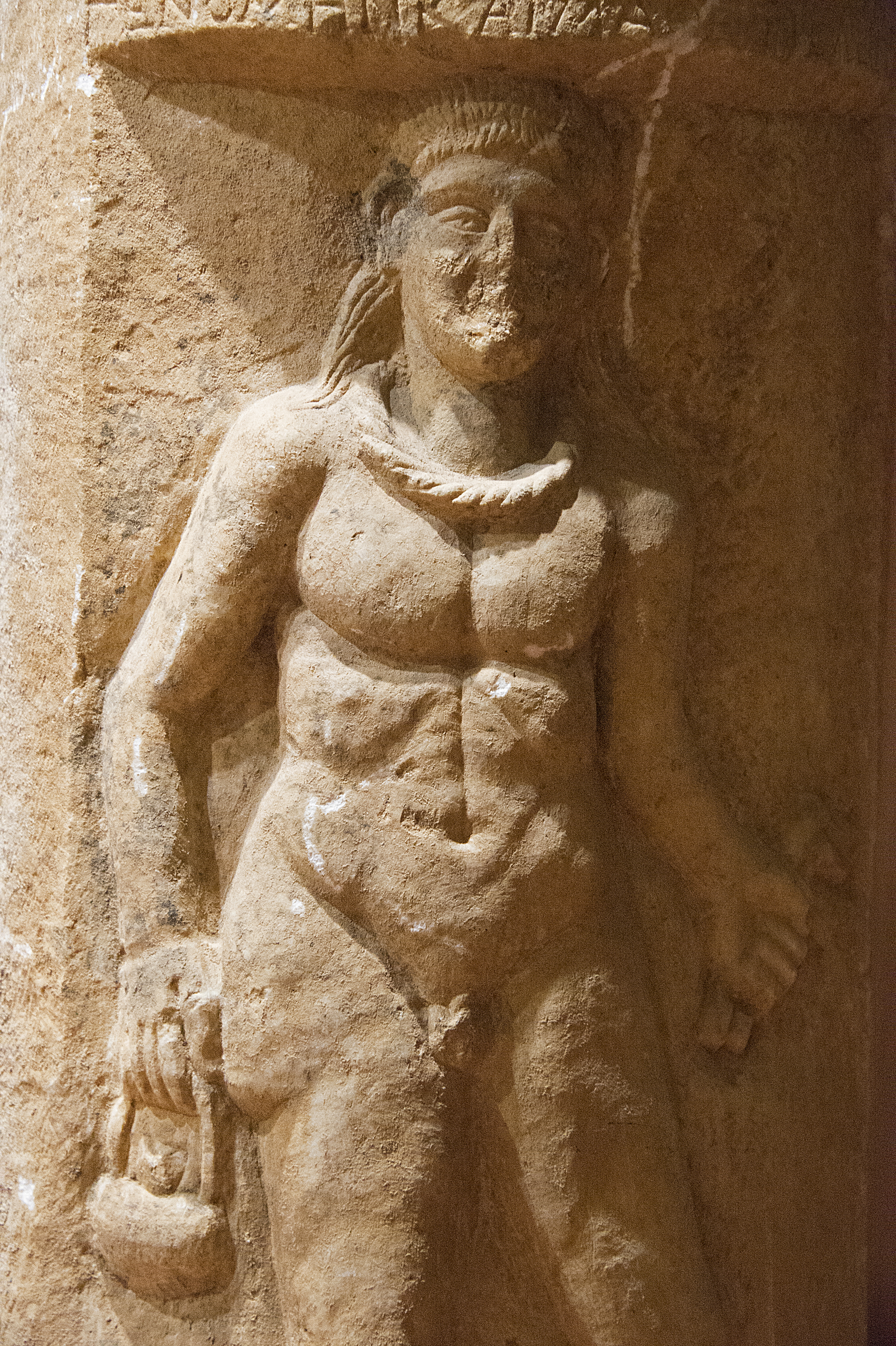
Milas Museum exhibits

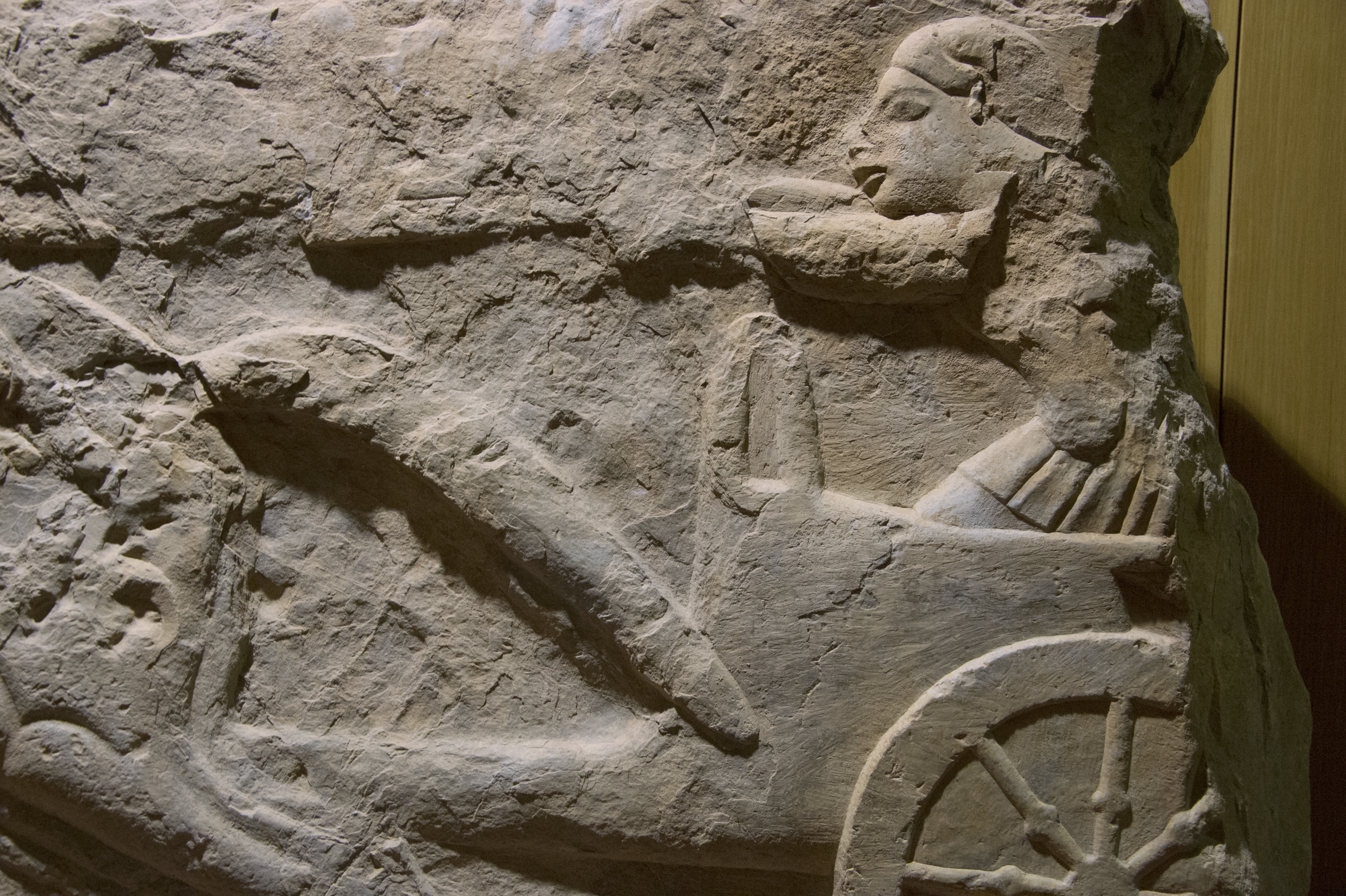
Milas Museum Hunting scene

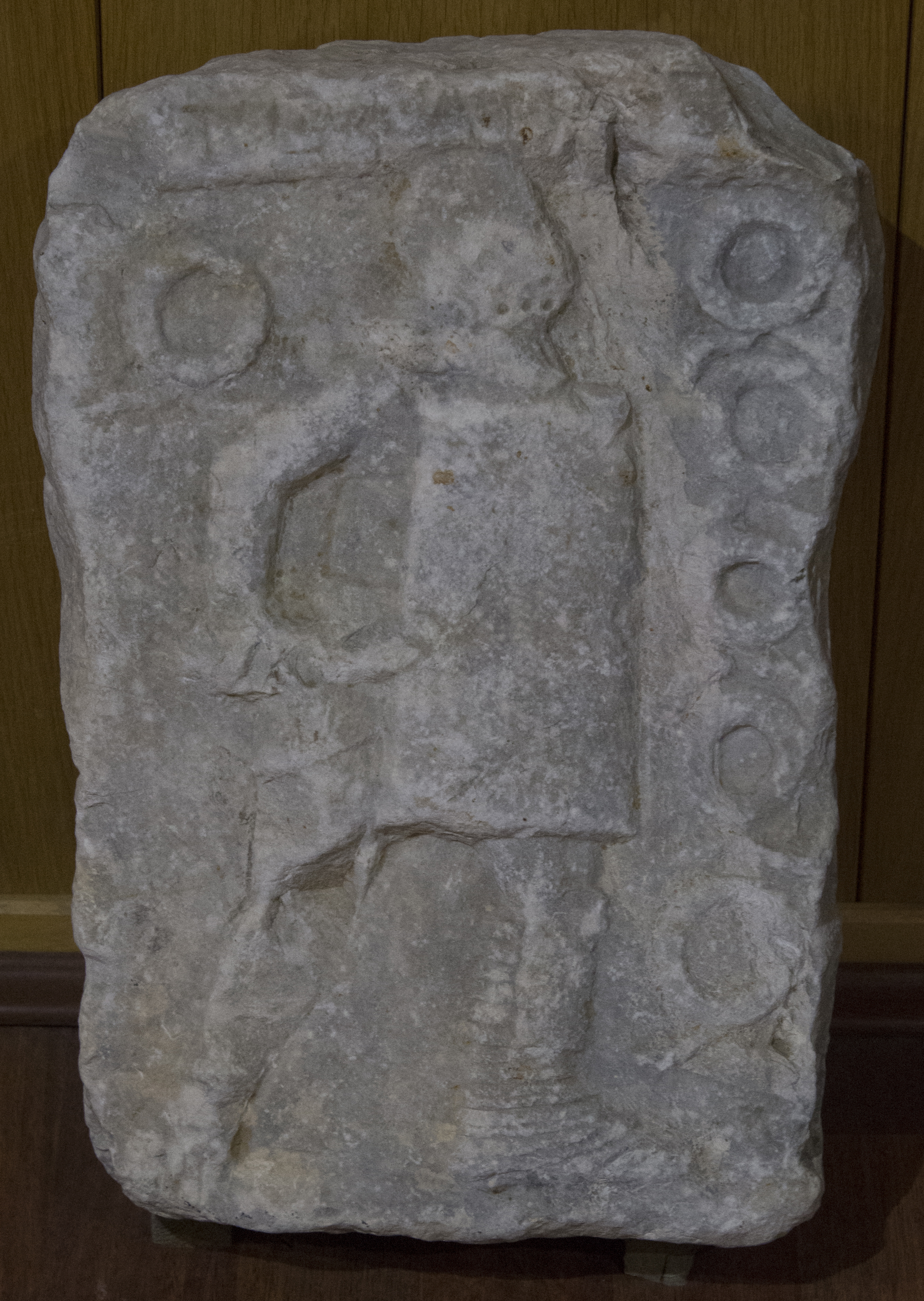
Milas Museum exhibits

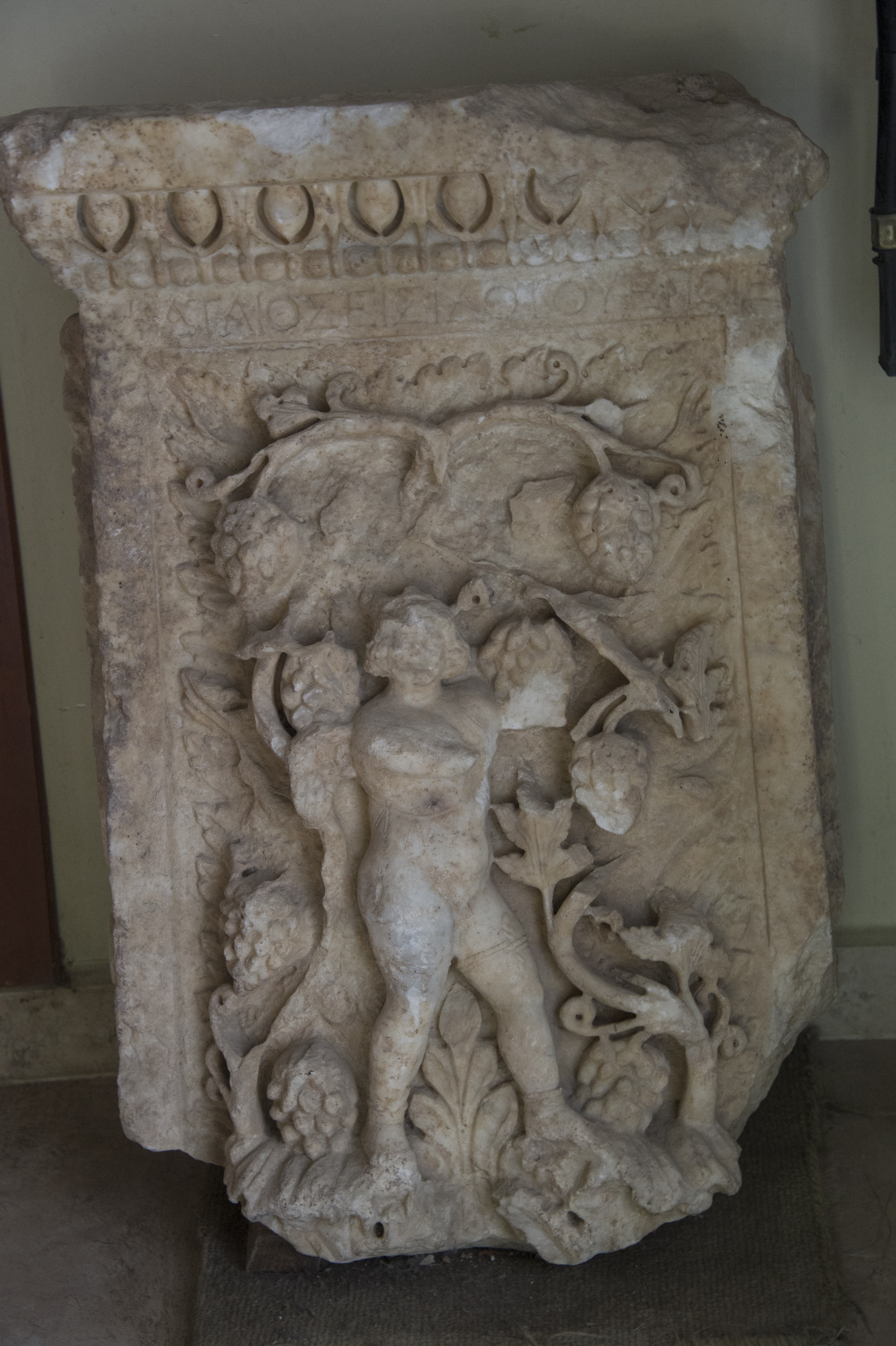
Milas Museum exhibits

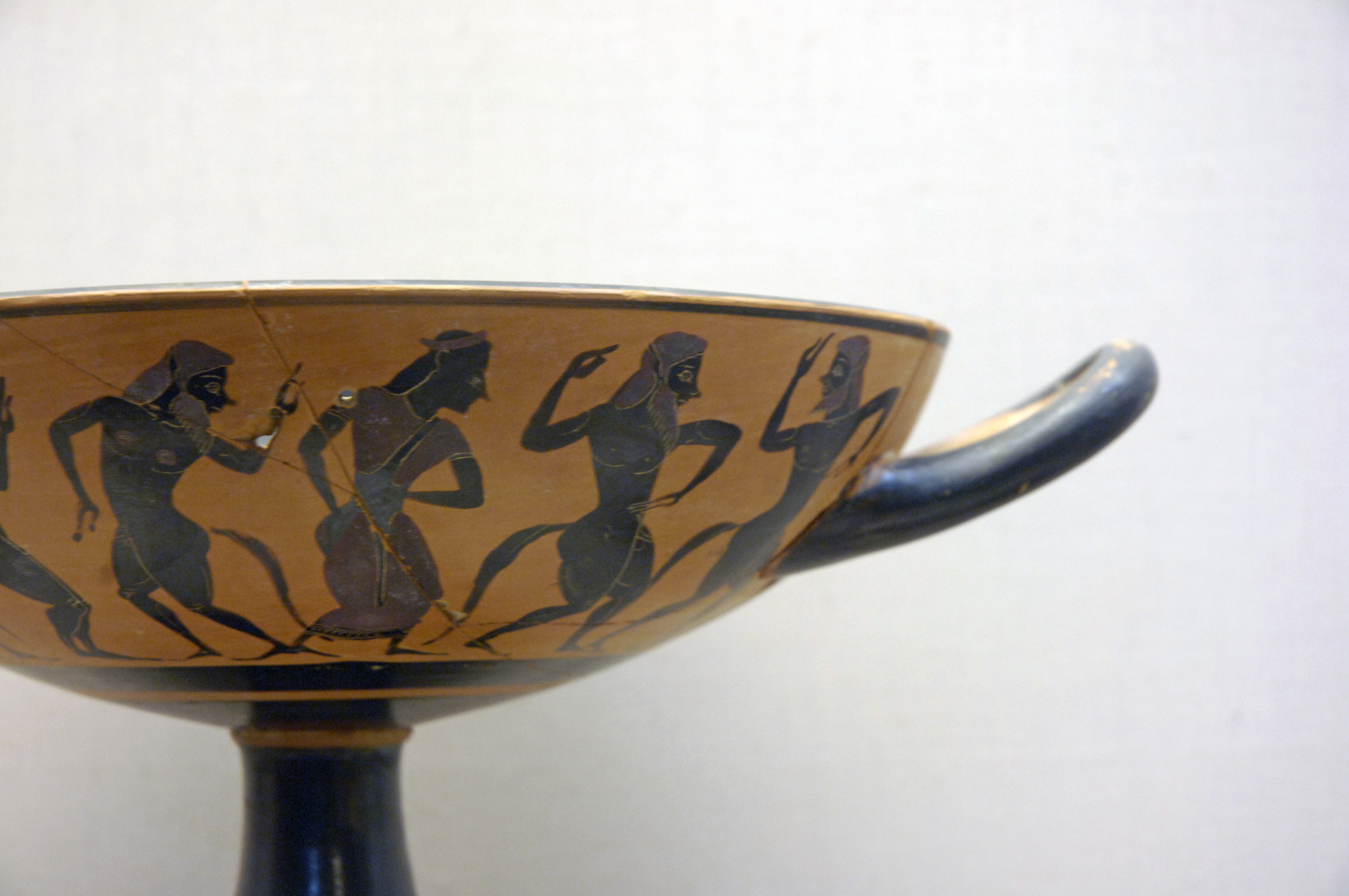
Milas Museum exhibits

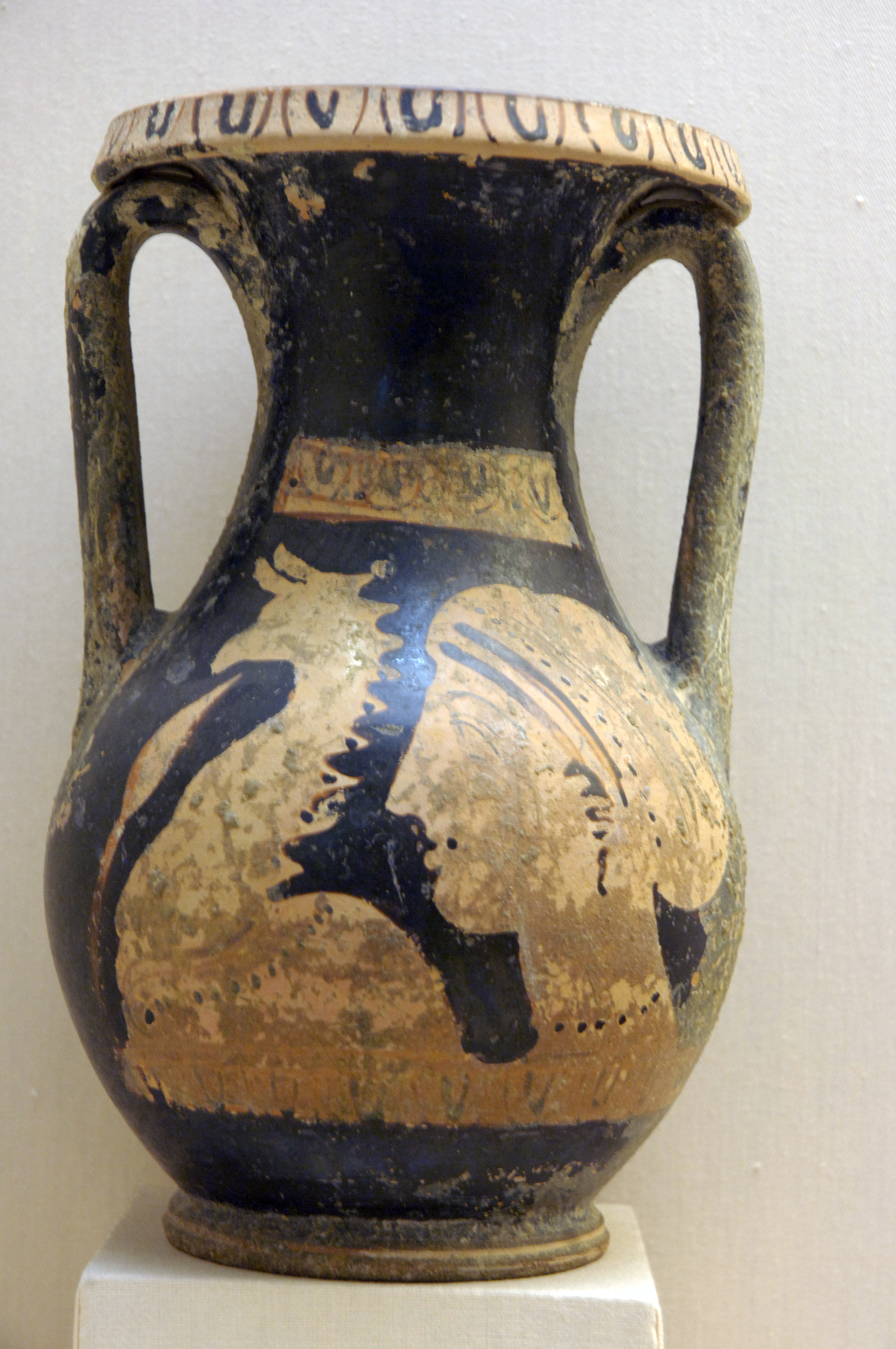
Milas Museum exhibits

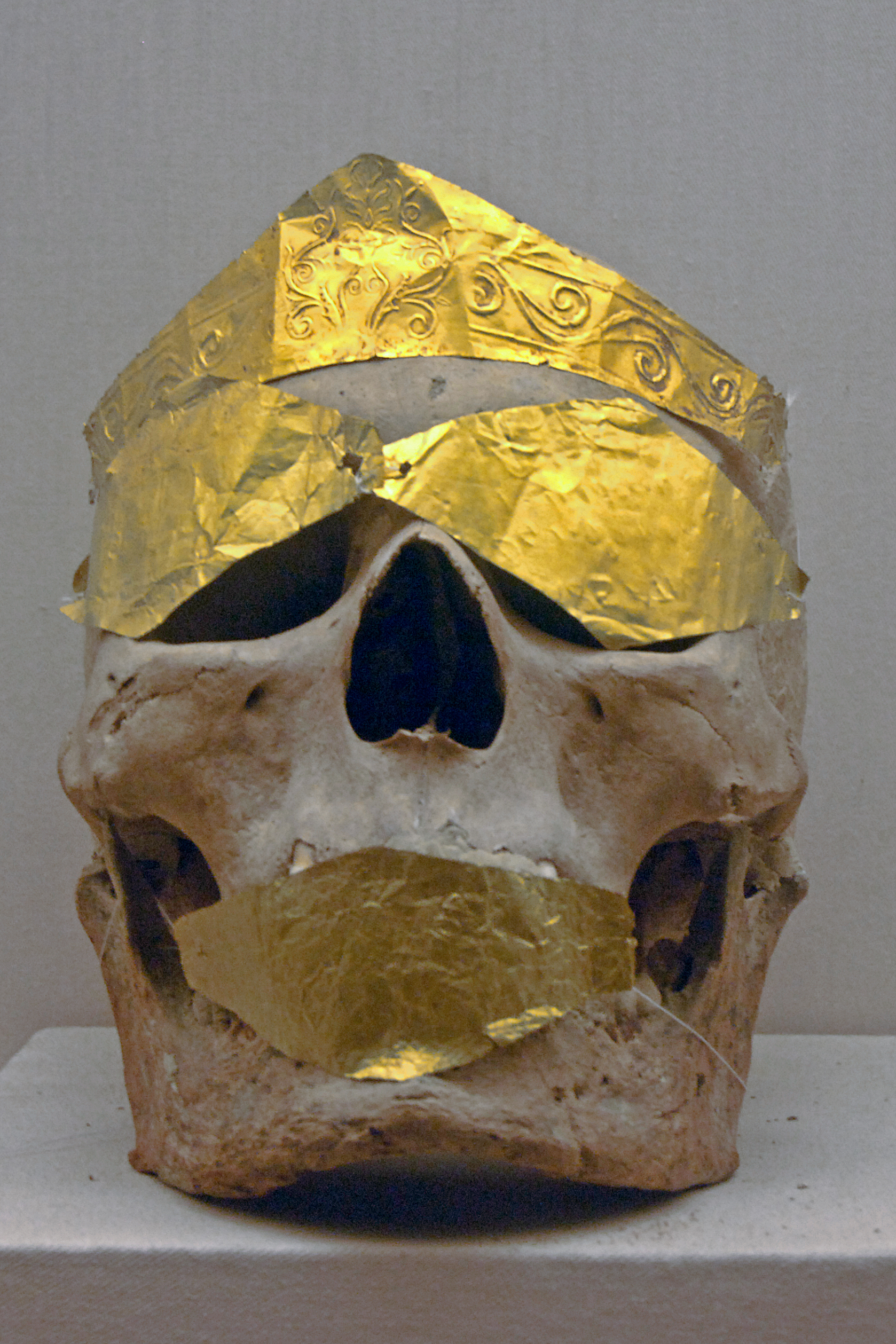
Milas Museum exhibits
