= Sarigerme =

Beach in Turkey

Coordinates: 36°42′N 28°41′E

Sarigerme Beach
- Beach
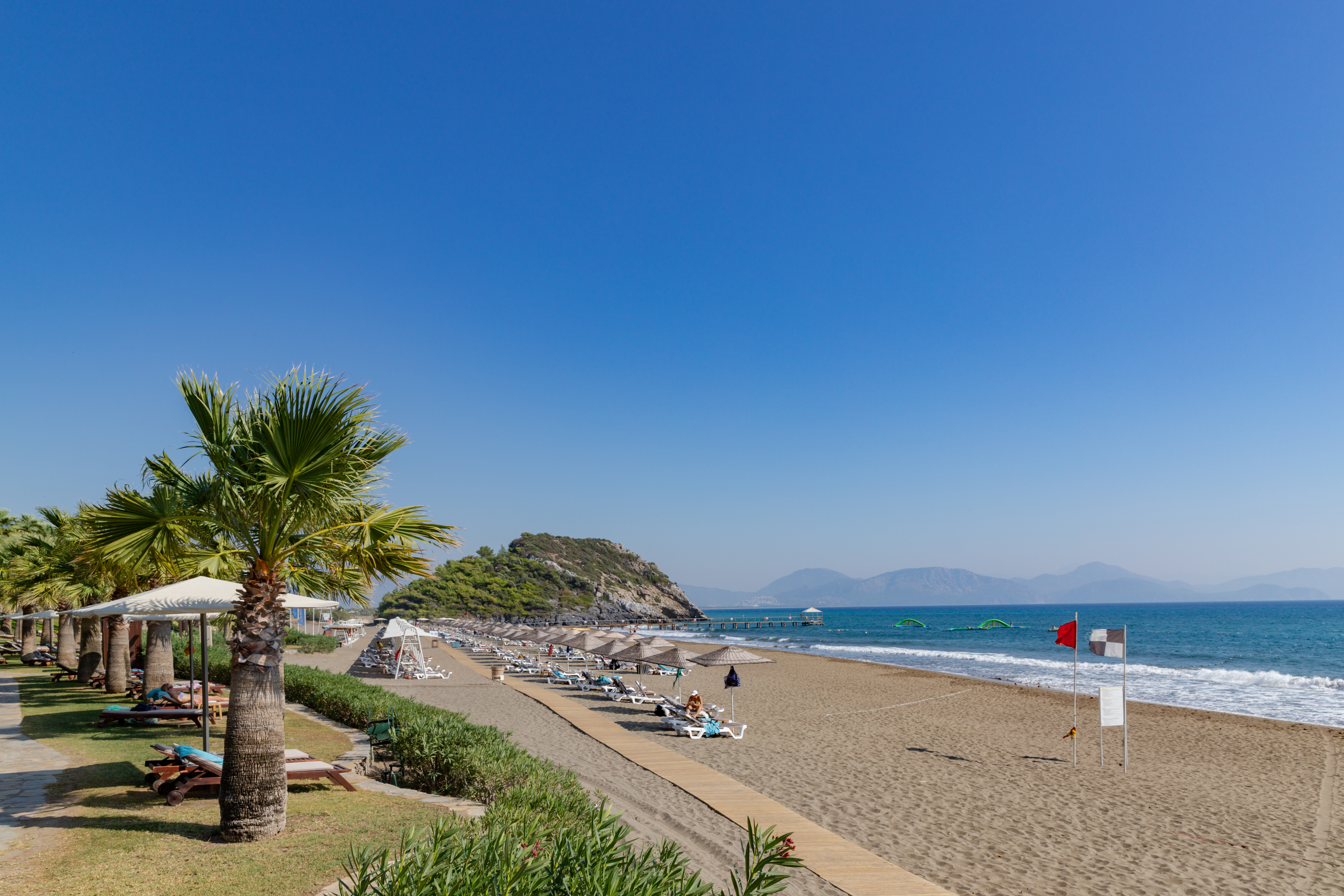
- Aegean Coast of Sarigerme
- Interactive map of Sarigerme Beach
- Location: Turkey, Turkish Riviera

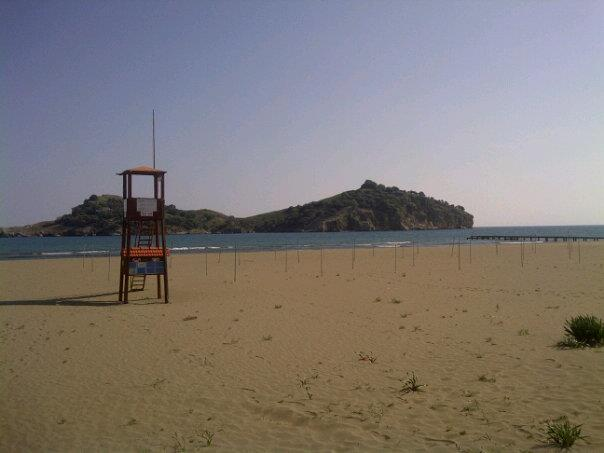
Sarigerme Beach

Sarıgerme is a beach near Osmaniye Village in Ortaca district, Muğla Province, south-west Turkey. It is a holiday destination with a beach and shops.

It also has a post office (pictured) as well as a few places to drink and eat.

There are number of villages around Sarıgerme: Gökbel, Mergenli, Karadonlar, Fevziye.

Sarıgerme is approximately 12 km from the airport town of Dalaman with good road access after being resurfaced several years ago.

This beach has pristine sands and it is very popular with Turkish and foreign tourists alike. The beach is long and sandy and there is usually quite a strong prevailing NW wind.

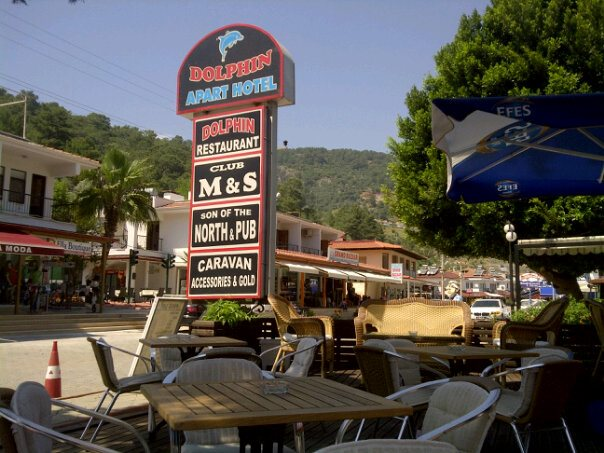
The High Street in the Village

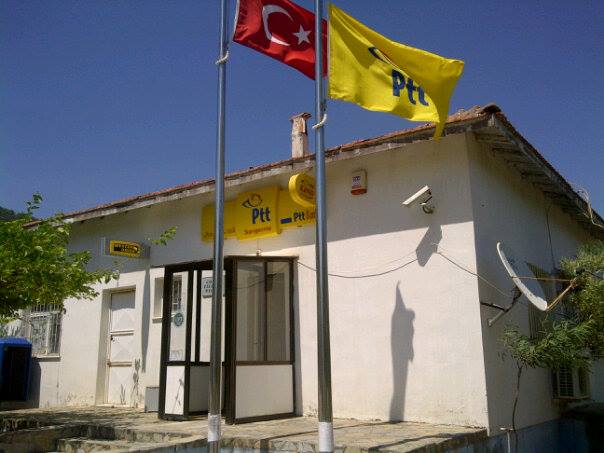
Post Office in the Village

It is close to Dalyan, Dalaman and Gölbaşı
