= Salih Ada =

Island in Turkey

Coordinates: 37°9′12″N 27°30′50″E

Location of Salih Ada, Turkey

Salih Ada (anciently, Taramptos (Ancient Greek: Ταράμπτος) and Caryanda (Ancient Greek: Καρύανδα)) is a Turkish island in the Aegean Sea, located north of Bodrum. It is located in the Muğla Province. It is located across Güvercinlik Bay on the Muğla-Bodrum highway. Salih Ada is a popular tourist destination, and is accessible by boat from Bodrum. The hills to the east of the island are covered with pine forest and olive groves. For the past decade, Kılıç Holding has occupied the northern end of the island for use in its fish farming operations. A strong smell emanates from the island when the nets are being cleaned. The site creates its own electricity and was the largest off-grid electrical system in Turkey when it was built in 2014.

The original location of the town of Caryanda was on this island before its relocation to the mainland. Under the name Taramptos, it was a member of the Delian League and is mentioned in a tribute decree of ancient Athens dated to 425/4 BCE. It is also mentioned in an inscription recovered at Halicarnassus dated to 300 BCE.
