= Caria =

Region of ancient Asia-Minor

Coordinates: 37.5°N 28.0°E

Caria (Καρία)
- Ancient region of Anatolia
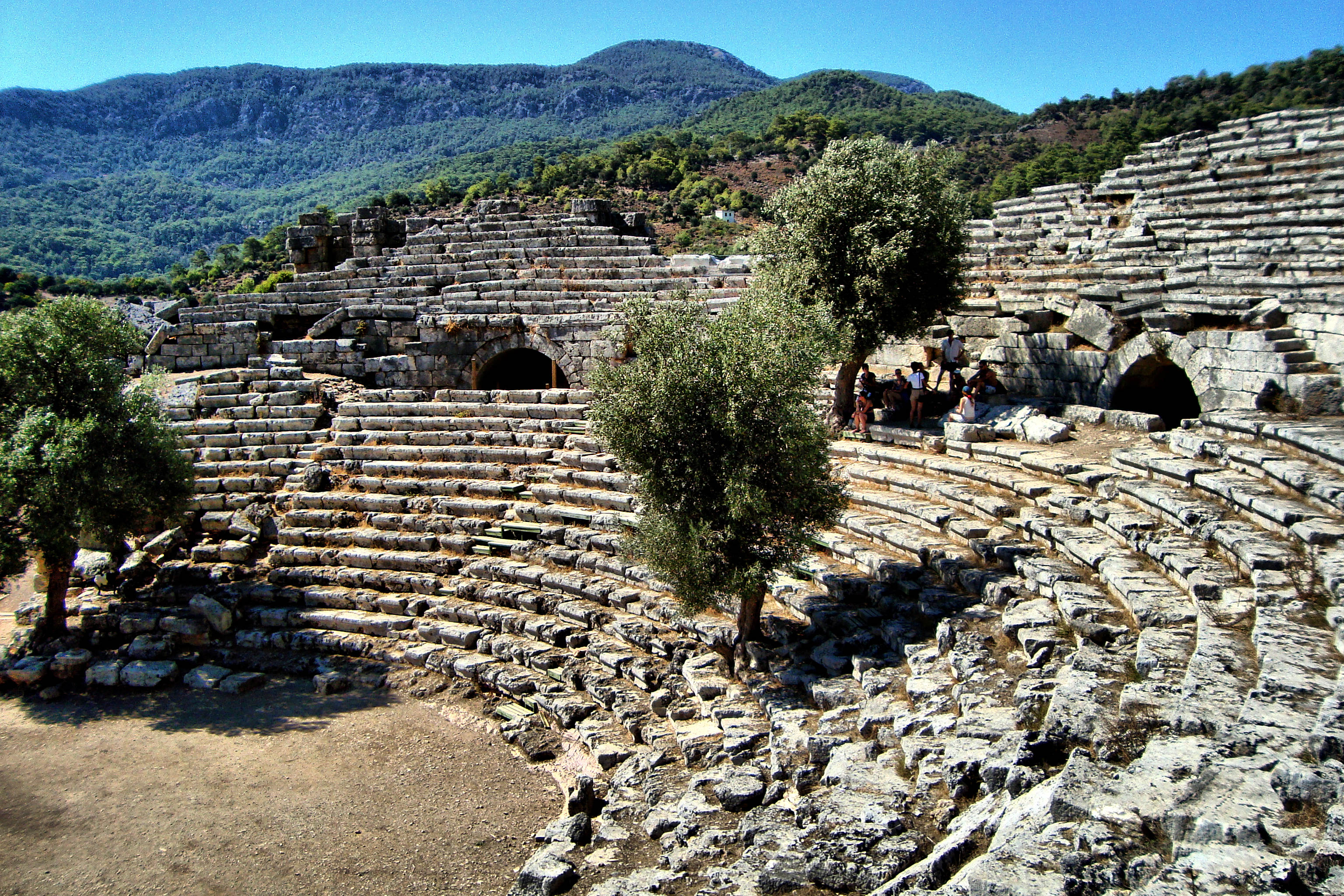
- Theater in Kaunos
- Location: Southwestern Anatolia, Turkey
- State existed: 11th–6th century BC
- Language: Carian
- Biggest city: Halicarnassus (modern-day Bodrum, Muğla, Turkey)
- Roman province: Asia
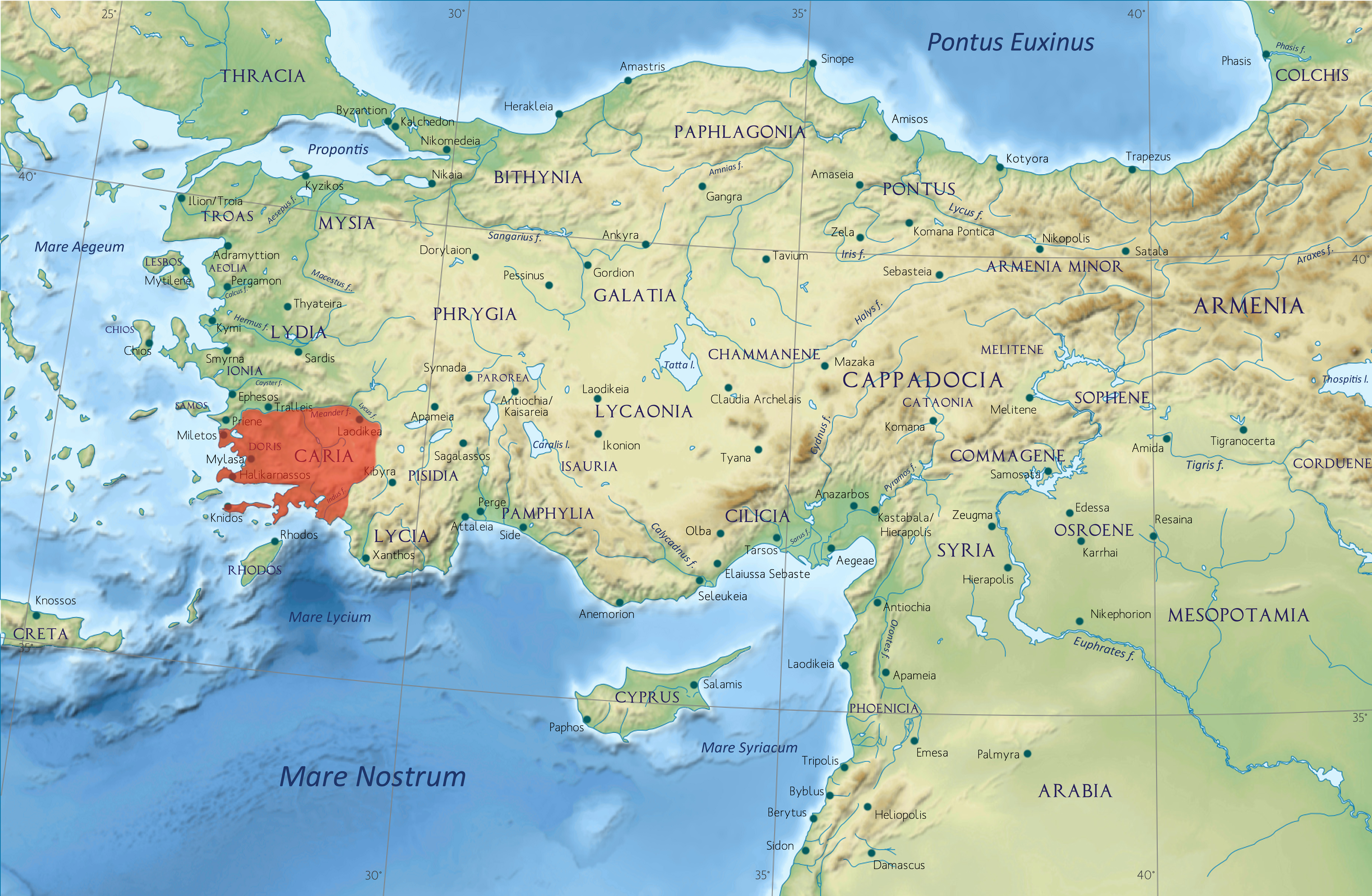
- Location of Caria within the classical regions of Asia Minor/Anatolia

Caria (/ˈkɛəriə/; from Greek: Καρία, Karia; Turkish: Karya) was a region of western Anatolia extending along the coast from mid-Ionia (Mycale) south to Lycia and east to Phrygia. The Carians spoke Carian, a native Anatolian language closely related to Luwian. Also closely associated with the Carians were the Leleges, which could be an earlier name for Carians.

== Municipalities of Caria ==
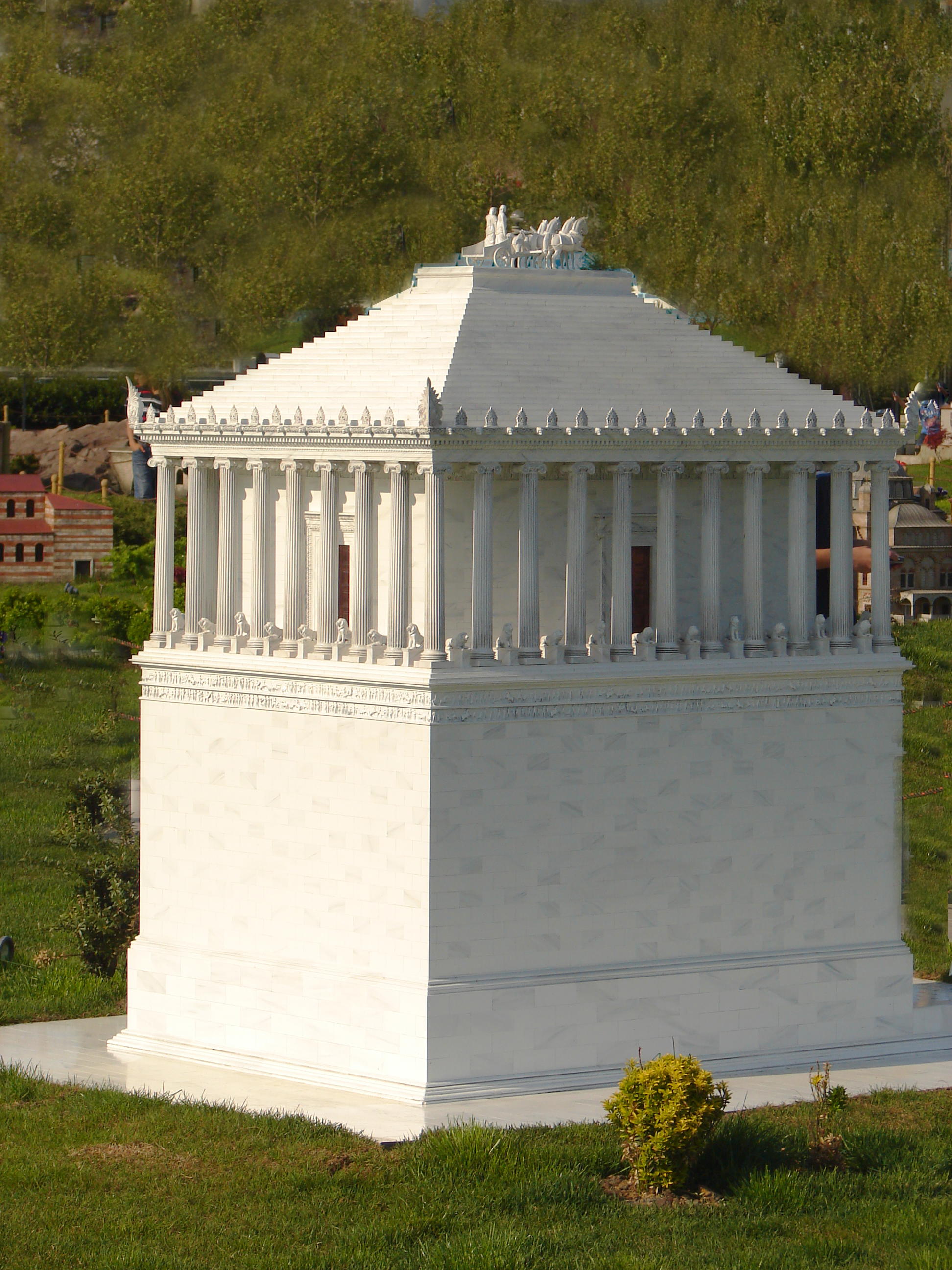
The Mausoleum at Halicarnassus, one of the Seven wonders of the ancient world, was built by Greek architects for the local Achaemenid satrap of Caria, Mausolus (Scale model)

Carian cities in white. This map depicts the current rivers and coastline and certain features have changed over the years, notably Miletus, Heracleia, and Myus were on the south side of a gulf and Priene on the north side; the river Maeander has since filled in the gulf. Also politically Telmessos, Miletus, and Kalynda were sometimes considered Carian and sometimes not

Cramer's detailed catalog of Carian towns is based entirely on ancient sources. The multiple names of towns and geomorphic features, such as bays and headlands, reveal an ethnic layering consistent with the known colonization.

=== Coastal Caria ===
Coastal Caria begins with Didyma south of Miletus, but Miletus had been placed in the pre-Ion Caria. South of it is the Iassicus Sinus (Güllük Körfezi) and the towns of Iassus and Bargylia, giving an alternative name of Bargyleticus Sinus to Güllük Körfezi, and nearby Cindye, which the Carians called Andanus. After Bargylia is Caryanda or Caryinda, and then on the Bodrum Peninsula Myndus (Mentecha or Muntecha), 56 miles (90 km) from Miletus. In the vicinity is Naziandus, exact location unknown.

On the tip of the Bodrum Peninsula (Cape Termerium) is Termera (Telmera, Termerea), and on the other side Ceramicus Sinus (Gökova Körfezi). It "was formerly crowded with numerous towns." Halicarnassus, a Dorian Greek city, was planted there among six Carian towns: Theangela, Sibde, Medmasa, Euranium, Pedasa or Pedasum, and Telmissus. These with Myndus and Syangela (or Syagela or Souagela) constitute the eight Lelege towns. Also on the north coast of the Ceramicus Sinus is Ceramus and Bargasus.

On the south of the Ceramicus Sinus is the Carian Chersonnese, or Triopium Promontory (Cape Krio), also called Doris after the Dorian colony of Cnidus. At the base of the peninsula (Datça Peninsula) is Bybassus or Bybastus from which an earlier names, the Bybassia Chersonnese, had been derived. It was now Acanthus and Doulopolis ("slave city").

South of the Carian Chersonnese is Doridis Sinus, the "Gulf of Doris" (Gulf of Symi), the locale of the Dorian Confederacy. There are three bays in it: Bubassius, Thymnias and Schoenus, the last enclosing the town of Hyda. In the gulf somewhere are Euthene or Eutane, Pitaeum, and an island: Elaeus or Elaeussa near Loryma. On the south shore is the Cynossema, or Onugnathos Promontory, opposite Symi.

South of there is the Rhodian Peraea, a section of the coast under Rhodes. It includes Loryma or Larymna in Oedimus Bay, Gelos, Tisanusa, the headland of Paridion, Panydon or Pandion (Cape Marmorice) with Physicus, Amos, Physca or Physcus, also called Cressa (Marmaris). Beyond Cressa is the Calbis River (Dalyan River). On the other side is Caunus (near Dalyan), with Pisilis or Pilisis and Pyrnos between.

Then follow some cities that some assign to Lycia and some to Caria: Calynda on the Indus River, Crya and Alina in the Gulf of Glaucus (Katranci Bay or the Gulf of Makri), the Glaucus River being the border. Other Carian towns in the gulf are Clydae or Lydae and Aenus.

=== Inland Caria ===
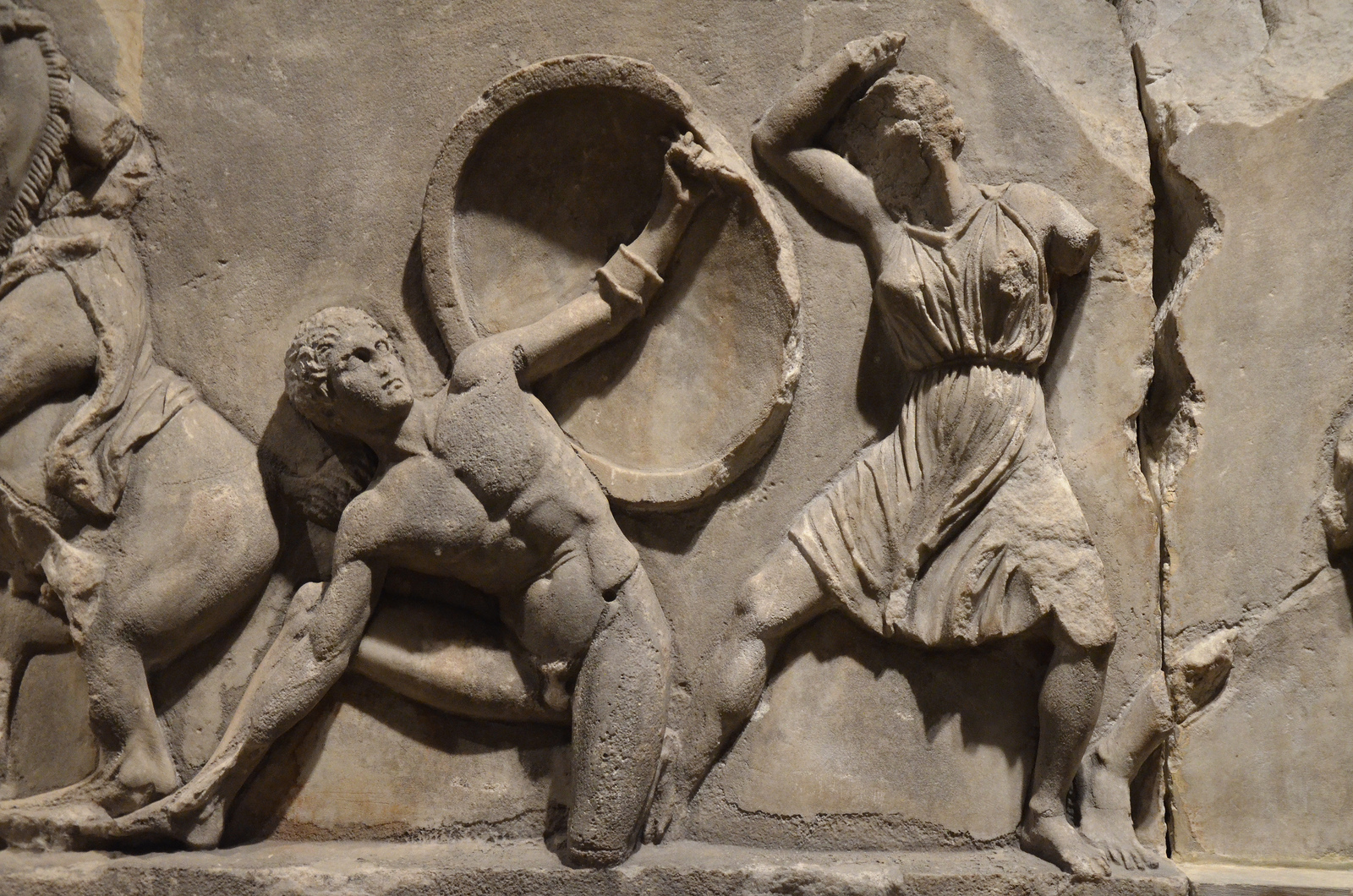
Relief of an Amazonomachy from the Mausoleum at Halicarnassus.

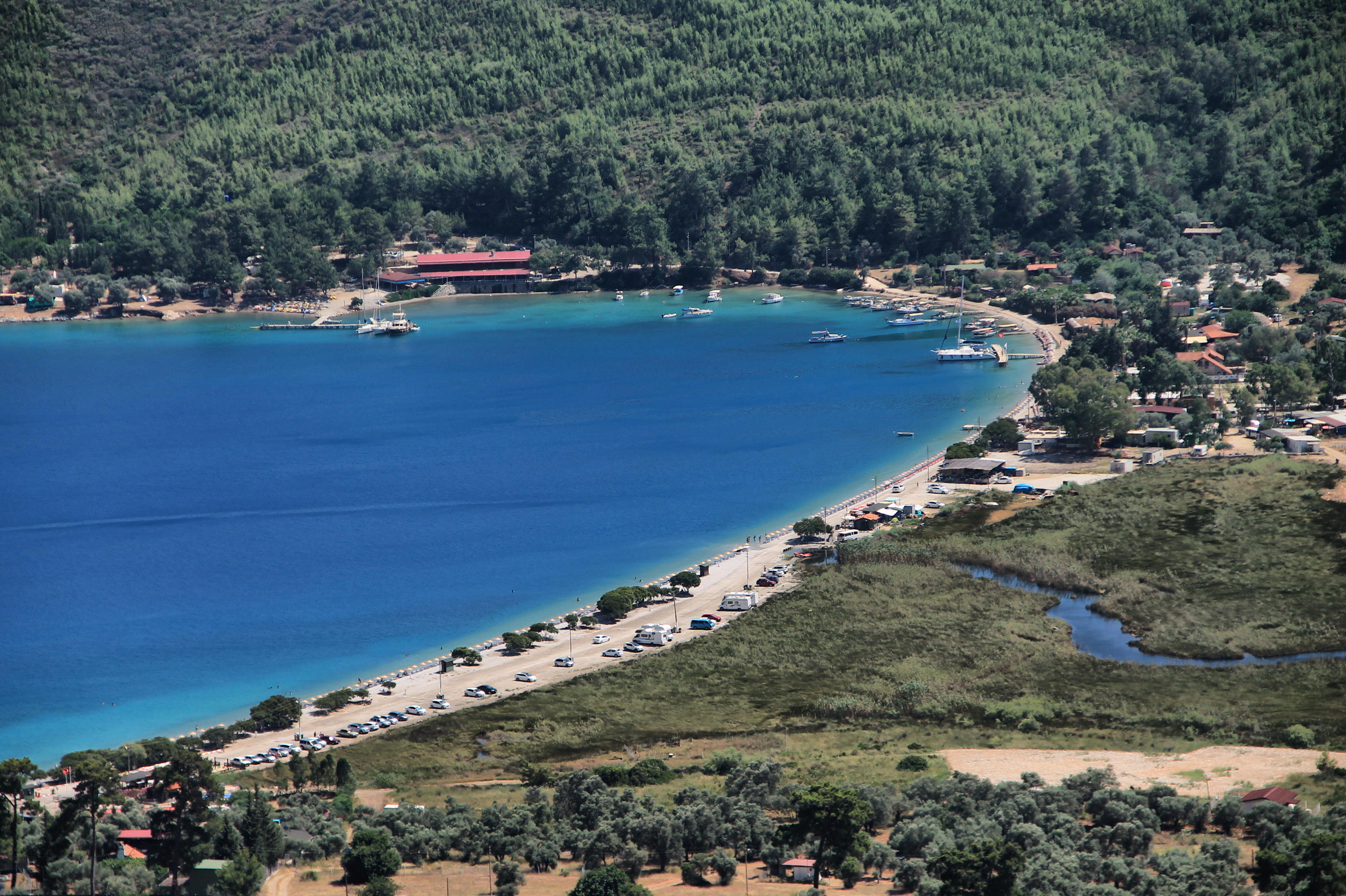
The coast of Milas.

At the base of the east end of Latmus near Euromus, and near Milas where the current village Selimiye is, was the district of Euromus or Eurome, possibly Europus, formerly Idrieus and Chrysaoris (Stratonicea). The name Chrysaoris once applied to all of Caria; moreover, Euromus was originally settled from Lycia. Its towns are Tauropolis, Plarasa and Chrysaoris. These were all incorporated later into Mylasa. Connected to the latter by a sacred way are Labraunda and Sinuri. Around Stratonicea is also Lagina as well as Panamara, Tendeba and Astragon.

Further inland towards Aydın is Alabanda, noted for its marble and its scorpions, Orthosia, Coscinia or Coscinus on the upper Maeander and Alinda. To the east is the religious centre Hyllarima. At the confluence of the Maeander and the Harpasus is Harpasa (Arpaz). At the confluence of the Maeander and the Orsinus, Corsymus or Corsynus is Antioch on the Maeander and on the Orsinus in the mountains a border town with Phrygia, Gordiutichos ("Gordius' Fort") near Geyre. Founded by the Leleges and called Ninoe it became Megalopolis ("Big City") and Aphrodisias, sometime capital of Caria.

Other towns on the Orsinus are Timeles and Plarasa. Tabae was at various times attributed to Phrygia, Lydia and Caria and seems to have been occupied by mixed nationals. Caria also comprises the headwaters of the Indus and Eriya or Eriyus and Thabusion on the border with the small state of Cibyra.

== History ==
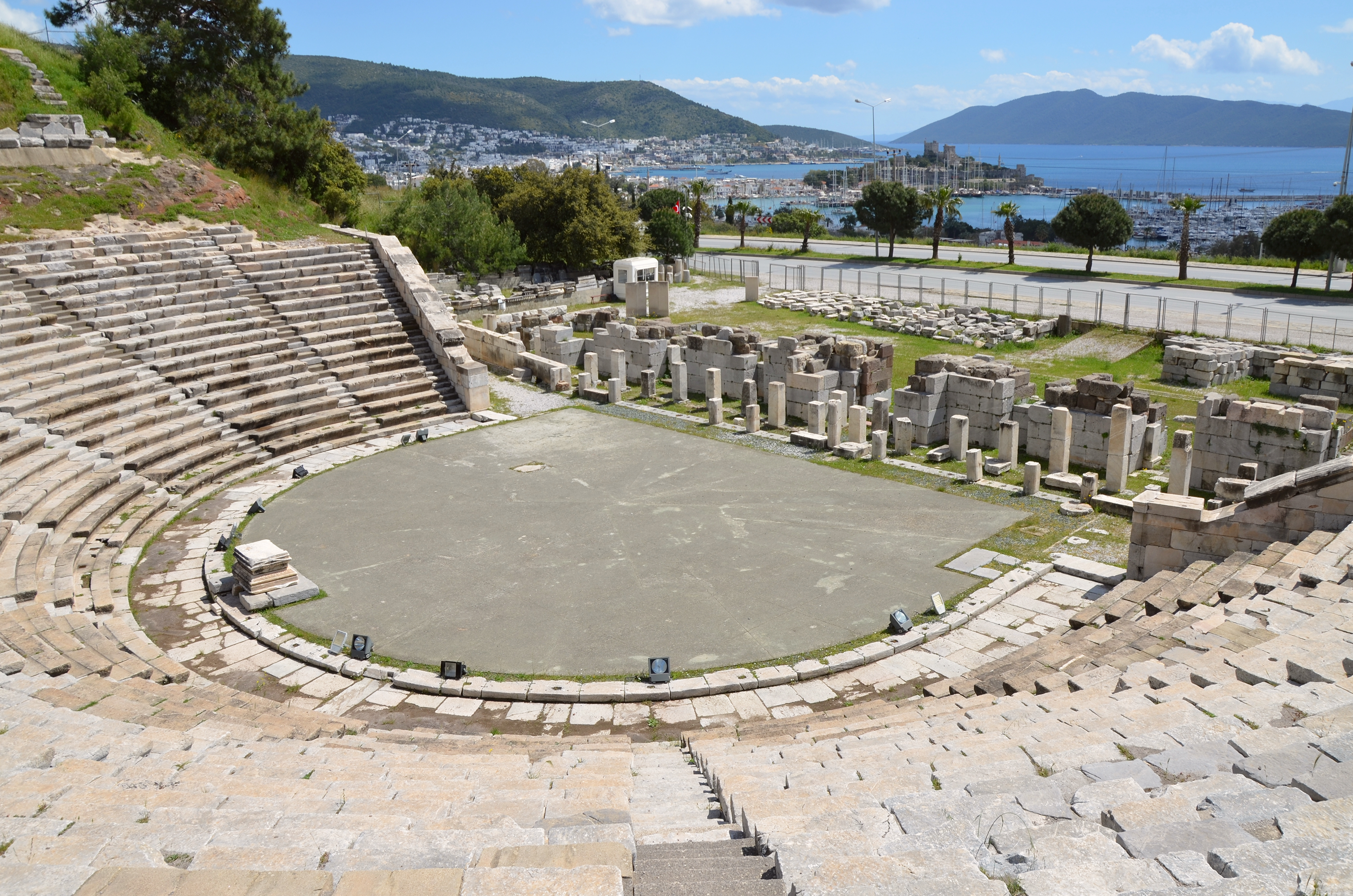
Theatre at Halicarnassus in Bodrum, with the Bodrum Castle seen in the background.

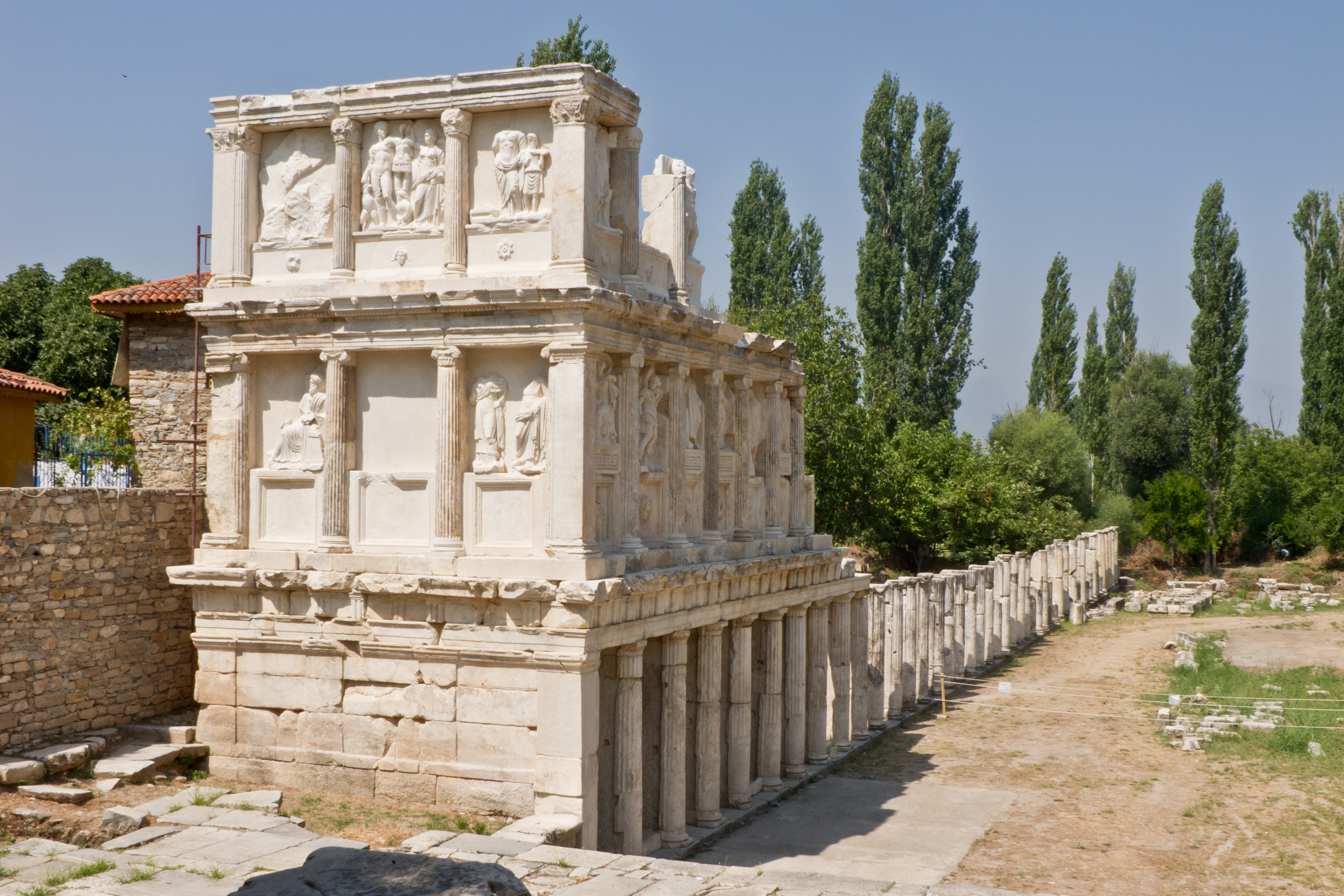
The Sebasteion of Aphrodisias

=== Bronze Age ===
Caria is often identified with the Bronze Age region of Karkiya (or Karkisa) known from Hittite texts, though this identification is uncertain.

=== Iron Age ===
==== Greek settlement ====
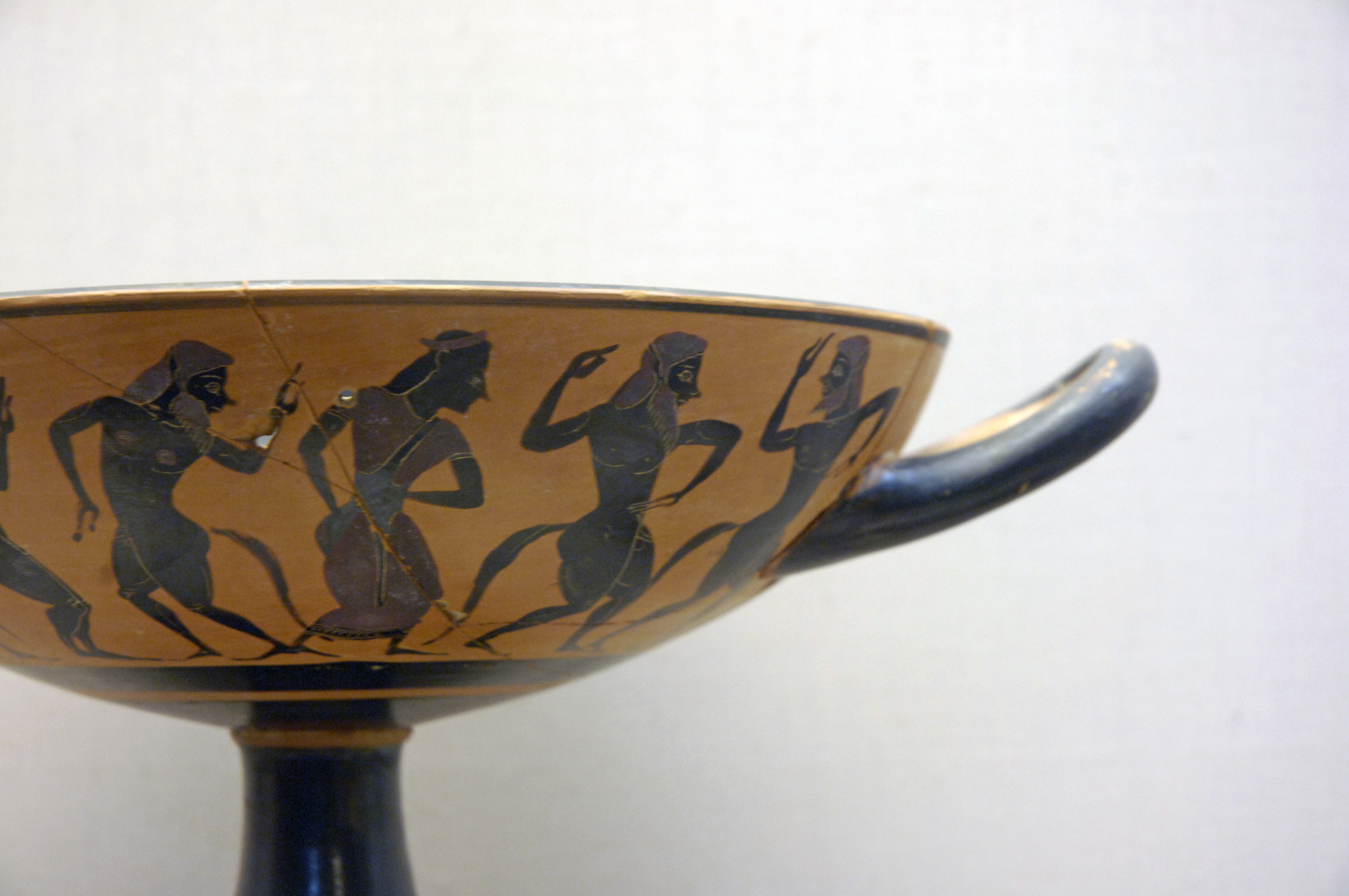
A kylix found in Milas on display at Milas Museum

Caria was settled by Greek immigrants in the Early Iron Age. Their presence is attested by protogeometric pottery which appears in the area around 1100 BC, along with other markers of Greek material culture.

The coast of Caria was part of the Doric hexapolis ("six-cities").

The Carians were described by Herodotus as being Anatolian mainlanders and they called themselves Caria because of the name of their king. He reports the Carians themselves maintained that they were Anatolian mainlanders intensely engaged in seafaring and were akin to the Mysians and the Lydians.

An account also cited that Aristotle claimed Caria, as a naval empire, occupied Epidaurus and Hermione and that this was confirmed when the Athenians discovered the graves of the dead from Delos. Half of it were identified as Carians based on the characteristics of the weapons they were buried with.

==== Lydian province ====
The expansionism of Lydia under Croesus (560-546 BC) incorporated Caria briefly into Lydia before it fell before the Achaemenid advance.

==== Persian satrapy ====
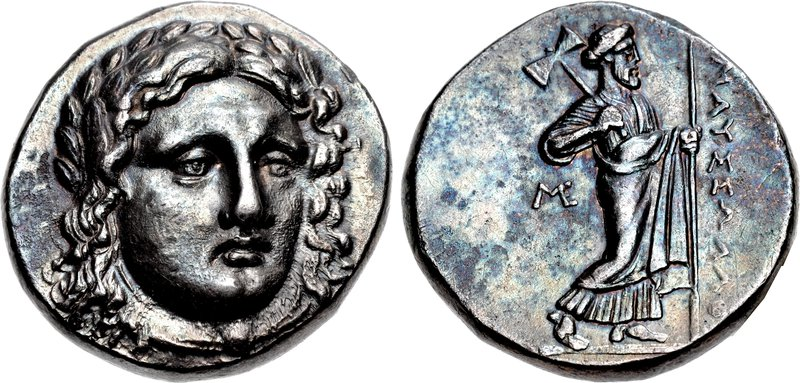
Coin of Maussolos as Achaemenid Satrap of Caria. Circa 377/6-353/2 BC

Caria was then incorporated into the Persian Achaemenid Empire as a satrapy (province) in 545 BC. The most important town was Halicarnassus, from where its sovereigns, the tyrants of the Lygdamid dynasty (c.520-450 BC), reigned. Other major towns were Latmus, refounded as Heracleia under Latmus, Antiochia, Myndus, Laodicea, Alinda and Alabanda. Caria participated in the Ionian Revolt (499–493 BC) against the Persian rule.

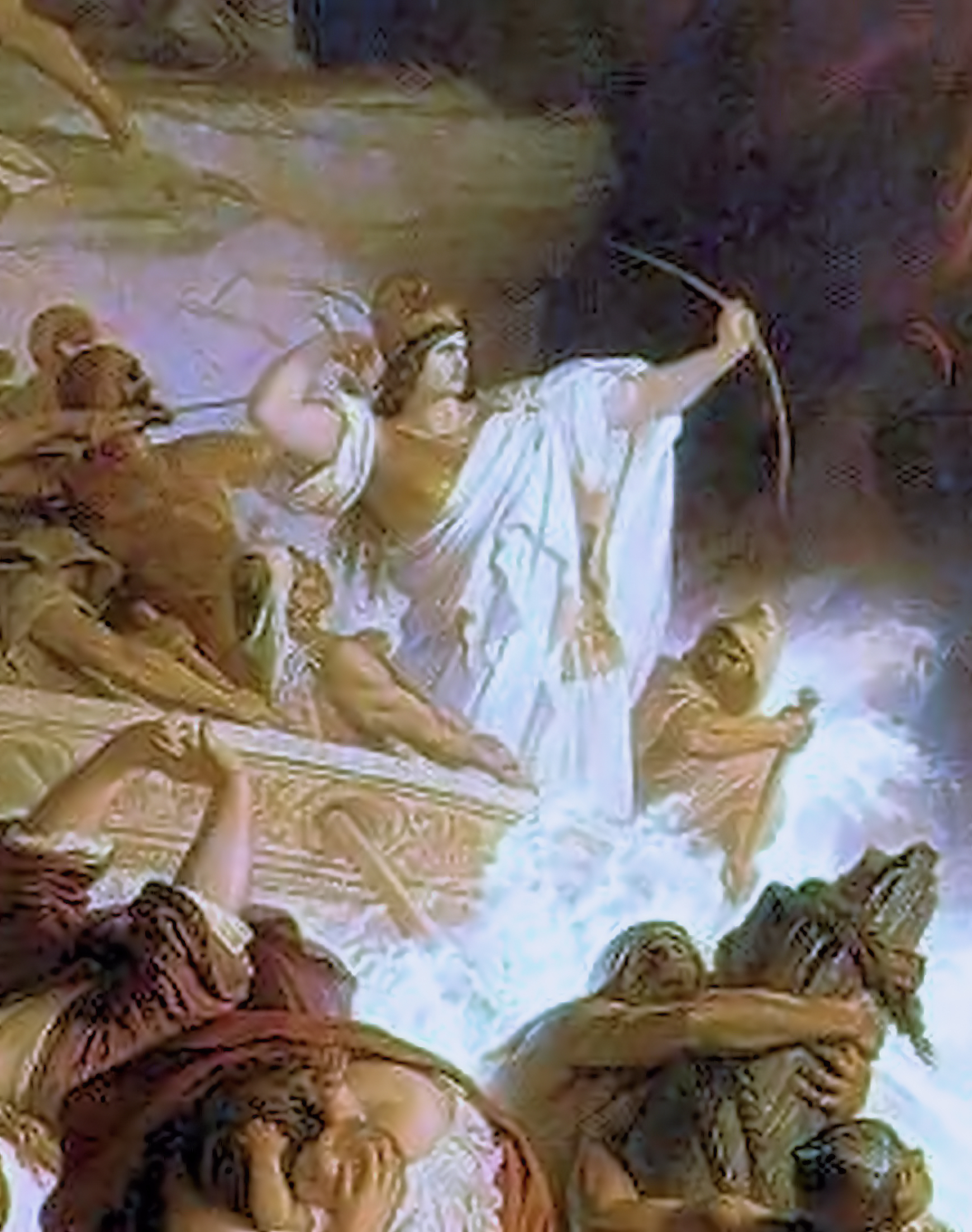
Artemisia, Queen of Halicarnassus, and commander of the Carian contingent, at the Battle of Salamis, 480 BC. Wilhelm von Kaulbach

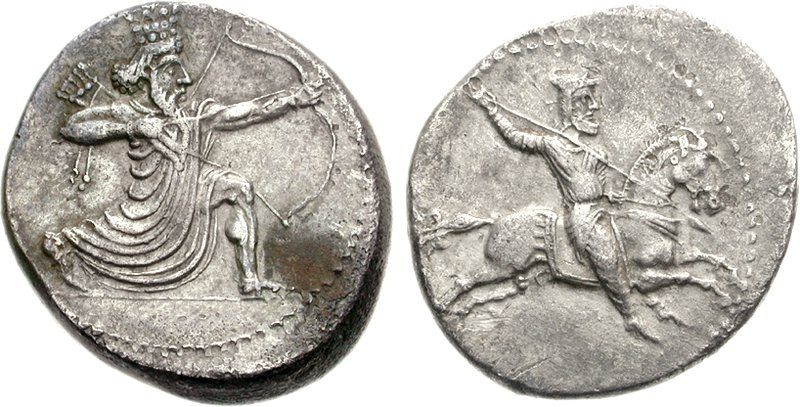
Coin of Caria, Achaemenid Period. Circa 350-334 BC.

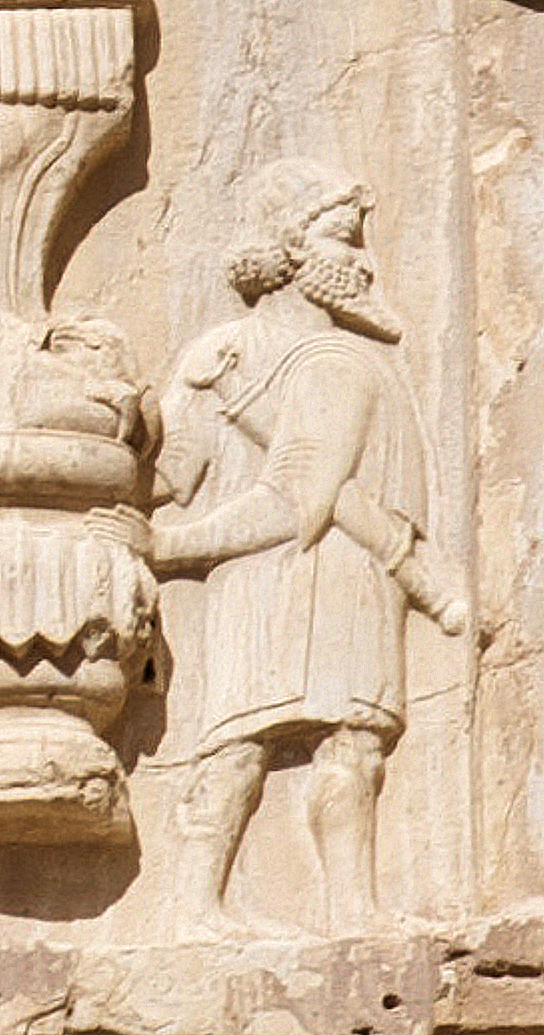
Carian soldier of the Achaemenid army, circa 480 BC. Relief on the tomb of Xerxes I.

During the Second Persian invasion of Greece (480-479 BC), the cities of Caria were allies of Xerxes I and they fought at the Battle of Artemisium and the Battle of Salamis, where the Queen of Halicarnassus Artemisia commanded the contingent of 70 Carian ships. Themistocles, before the battles of Artemisium and Salamis, tried to split the Ionians and Carians from the Persian coalition. He told them to come and be on his side or not to participate at the battles, but if they were bound down by too strong a compulsion to be able to make revolt, when the battles begin, to be purposely slack. Plutarch in his work, The Parallel Lives, at The Life of Themistocles wrote that: "Phanias (Greek: Φαινίας), writes that the mother of Themistocles was not a Thracian, but a Carian woman and her name was Euterpe (Eυτέρπη), and Neanthes (Νεάνθης) adds that she was from Halicarnassus in Caria.".

After the unsuccessful Persian invasion of Greece in 479 BC, the cities of Caria became members of the Athenian-led Delian League, but then returned to Achaemenid rule for about one century, from around 428 BC. Under Achaemenid rule, the Carian dynast Mausolus took control of neighbouring Lycia, a territory which was still held by Pixodarus as shown by the Xanthos trilingual inscription.

Halicarnassus was the location of the famed Mausoleum dedicated to Mausolus, a satrap of Caria between 377–353 BC, by his wife, Artemisia II of Caria. The monument became one of the Seven Wonders of the Ancient World, and from which the Romans named any grand tomb a mausoleum.

==== Hellenistic period ====
The Carians were incorporated into the Macedonian Empire following the conquests of Alexander the Great and the Siege of Halicarnassus in 334 BC.

Caria was conquered by Alexander III of Macedon in 334 BC with the help of the former queen of the land Ada of Caria who had been dethroned by the Persian Empire and actively helped Alexander in his conquest of Caria on condition of being reinstated as queen. After their capture of Caria, she declared Alexander as her heir.

Asander, a general of Alexander, would go on to become the satrap of Caria and play an important role in the Third War of the Diadochi.

=== Roman-Byzantine province ===
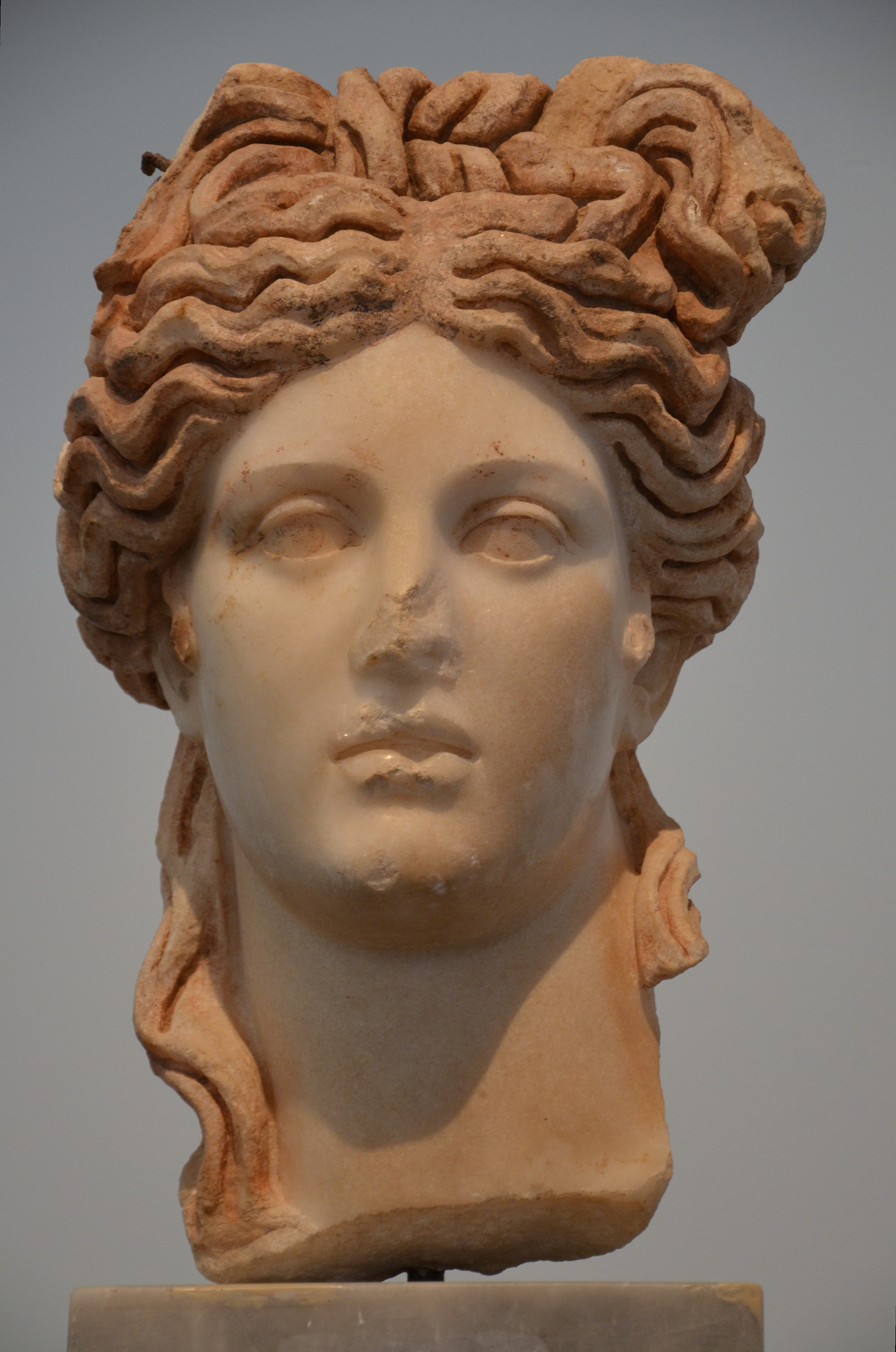
Marble head of a goddess, found in the Hadrianic Baths of Aphrodisias, 2nd century AD.

As part of the Roman Empire the name of Caria was still used for the geographic region. The territory administratively belonged to the province of Asia. During the administrative reforms of the 4th century this province was abolished and divided into smaller units. Caria became a separate province as part of the Diocese of Asia.

Christianity was on the whole slow to take hold in Caria. The region was not visited by Paul the Apostle, and the only early churches seem to be those of Laodicea and Colossae (Chonae) on the extreme inland fringe of the country, which itself pursued its pagan customs. It appears that it was not until Christianity was officially adopted in Constantinople that the new religion made any real headway in Caria.

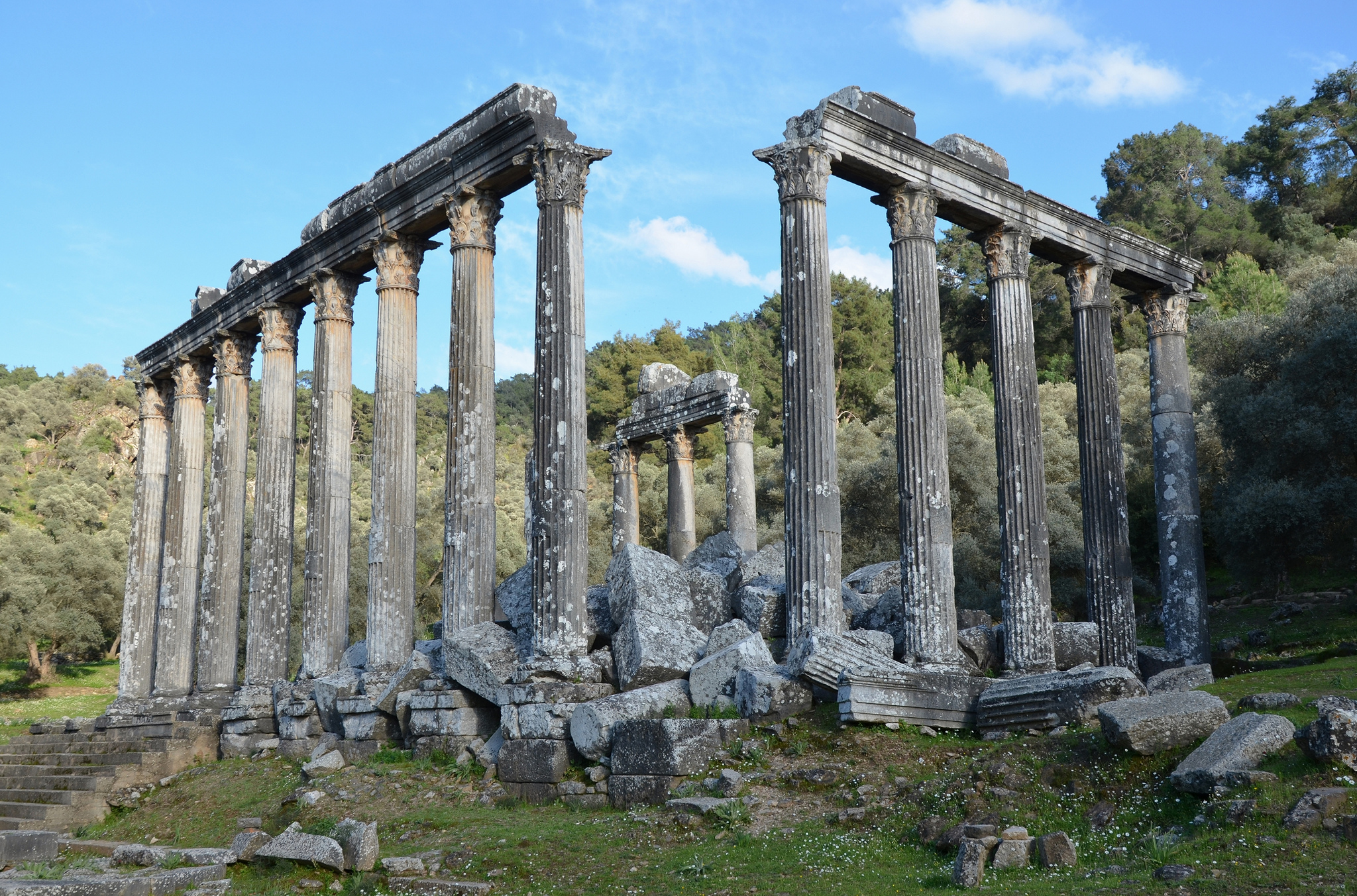
The Temple of Zeus Lepsinos at Euromus was built on the site of an earlier Carian temple in the 2nd century AD during the reign of the emperor Hadrian.

=== Dissolution under the Byzantine Empire and passage to Turkish rule ===
In the 7th century, Byzantine provinces were abolished and the new military theme system was introduced. The region corresponding to ancient Caria was captured by the Turks under the Menteşe Dynasty in the early 13th century.

There are only indirect clues regarding the population structure under the Menteşe and the parts played in it by Turkish migration from inland regions and by local conversions. The first Ottoman Empire census records indicate, in a situation not atypical for the region as a whole, a large Muslim (practically exclusively Turkish) majority reaching as high as 99% and a non-Muslim minority (practically exclusively Carian supplemented with a small Jewish community in Milas) as low as one per cent. One of the first acts of the Ottomans after their takeover was to transfer the administrative center of the region from its millenary seat in Milas to the then much smaller Muğla, which was nevertheless better suited for controlling the southern fringes of the province. Still named Menteşe until the early decades of the 20th century, the kazas corresponding to ancient Caria are recorded by sources such as G. Sotiriadis (1918) and S. Anagiostopoulou (1997) as having a Greek population averaging at around ten per cent of the total, ranging somewhere between twelve and eighteen thousand, many of them reportedly recent immigrants from the islands. Most chose to leave in 1919, before the population exchange.

=== Archaeology ===
In July 2021, archaeologists led by Abuzer Kızıl have announced the discovery of two 2,500-year-old marble statues and an inscription during excavations at the Temple of Zeus Lepsynos in Euromus. According to Abuzer Kızıl, one of the statues was naked while other was wearing armor made of leather and a short skirt. Both of the statues were depicted with a lion in their hands.

== See also ==
- Ancient regions of Anatolia
- Carians
- Carian language
- Aphrodisias

== Bibliography ==
- Bean, George E. (1971). Turkey beyond the Maeander. London: Frederick A. Praeger. ISBN 0-87471-038-3.
- Cramer, J.A. (1832). Geographical and Historical Description of Asia Minor; with a Map: Volume II. Oxford: University Press. Section X Caria. Downloadable Google Books.
- Herodotus (1910) [original c. 440 BC]. History of Herodotus . Translated by George Rawlinson – via Wikisource.
