= Myndus =

Ancient Dorian colony of Troezen

- Μύνδος (Greek)
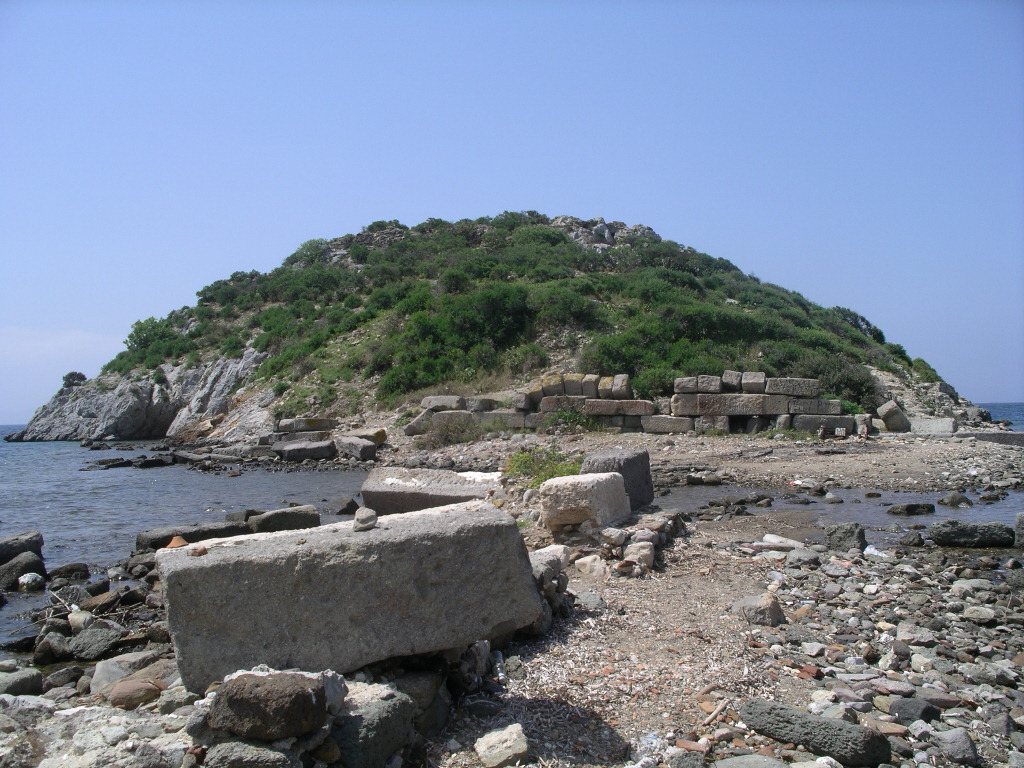
- Myndos' Rabbit Island in modern Gümüşlük

- Location within Turkey
- 37°3′11″N 27°14′0″E
- Location: Gümüşlük, Muğla Province, Turkey
- Region: Caria

Myndus (/ˈmɪndəs/) or Myndos (Greek: Μύνδος) was an ancient Dorian colony of Troezen, on the coast of Caria in Asia Minor (Turkey), sited on the Bodrum Peninsula, a few miles northwest of Halicarnassus. The site is now occupied by the modern village of Gümüşlük.

== History ==
Myndos was protected by strong walls, and had a good harbor. (Paus. ii. 30. § 8; Strabo xiv. p. 658; Arrian, Anab. i. 20, ii. 5.) Otherwise, the place is not of much importance in ancient history. Both Pliny (v. 29) and Stephanus of Byzantium (s. v.) mention Palaemyndus as an ancient Carian settlement near to Myndus, which seems to have become deserted after Dorian Mynduse was founded. (Comp. Strab. xiii. p. 611). Mela (i. 16) and Pliny (l. c.) also speak of Neapolis in the same peninsula and as no other authors mention such a place in that part of the country, it had been supposed that Myndus (the Dorian colony) and Neapolis were the same place. Pliny, however, mentions both Myndus and Neapolis as two different towns, and modern scholars differentiate the two.

The cynic philosopher Diogenes of Sinope visited Myndos and noticed how large the city gates were, relative to the town; he cynically remarked; "Oh men of Myndos, I urge you to shut the city gates, as your town might exit from these!".

Myndian ships are mentioned in the expedition of Anaxagoras against Naxos. (Herod. v. 33.) Herodotus relates the story of how a captain from Myndus, Scylax, was found to have left no guards on his ship while a Persian force was preparing to attack the island of Naxos. The Persian commander, Megabates, flew into a rage and had him put in stocks, at which point Aristagoras, a tyrant from Miletus helping several Naxian oligarchs to retake Naxos, discovered what had happened to his guest-friend Scylax. Pleading with Megabates to no avail for Scylax, he released him anyway, incurring the Persian commander's wrath. The consequence of this falling out was that, according to Herodotus, Megabates warned the Naxians of what was afoot, ruining the expedition and in turn Aristagoras who, with nowhere to go, stirred up the Ionian Revolt. This is a classic example of Ionian αταξιη (lack of discipline, disorder, licentiousness), a charge commonly levelled at them, especially in the 5th century by Athens.

At a later time, when Alexander the Great besieged Halicarnassus, he was anxious first to make himself master of Myndus; but when he attempted to take it by surprise, the Myndians, with the aid of reinforcements from Halicarnassus repulsed him with some loss. (Arrian, l. c.; comp. Hecat. Fragm. 229; Polyb. xvi. 15, 21; Scylax, p. 38; Ptol. v. 2. § 9; Liv. xxxvii. 15; Hierocl. p. 687.) Athenaeus (i. 32) states that the wine grown in the district of Myndus was good for digestion.

Remains of the city are visible in and around Gümüşlük and in the adjacent waters; it is supposed that some unrecorded earthquake caused seafront sections of the ancient town to be submerged. As a result, much of the land and offshore areas are protected from interference and development.

== Ecclesiastical history ==
Myndus was an episcopal see of Caria, a suffragan of Stauropolis (Aphrodisias). The Notitiæ episcopatuum allude to it as late as the 12th or 13th century. However, only four of its bishops are known: Archelaus, who attended the First Council of Ephesus (431); Alphius, who assisted at the Council of Chalcedon (451); John who was present at the Third Council of Constantinople (680); and another John who went to the Second Council of Nicaea (787).

The bishopric is included in the Catholic Church's list of titular sees.

== Notable people ==
- Alexander of Myndus, ancient Greek writer
- Apollonius of Myndus, ancient Greek astrologer
- Eusebius of Myndus, ancient Greek philosopher
- Botryas of Myndus, ancient Greek writer
- Zenon of Myndus, ancient Greek writer
