= Latmos =

Latmos or LATMOS may refer to:

- Beşparmak Mountains, a ridge of many spurs located in the Muğla and Aydın provinces of Turkey;
- Laboratoire atmosphères, milieux, observations spatiales, a French research laboratory specialized in the study of the physical and chemical processes of the Earth's atmosphere.
- Latmus (town), an ancient city and member of the Delian League
