= Beşparmak Mountains =

Mountain range

Beşparmak Dağı
- Mount Latmus
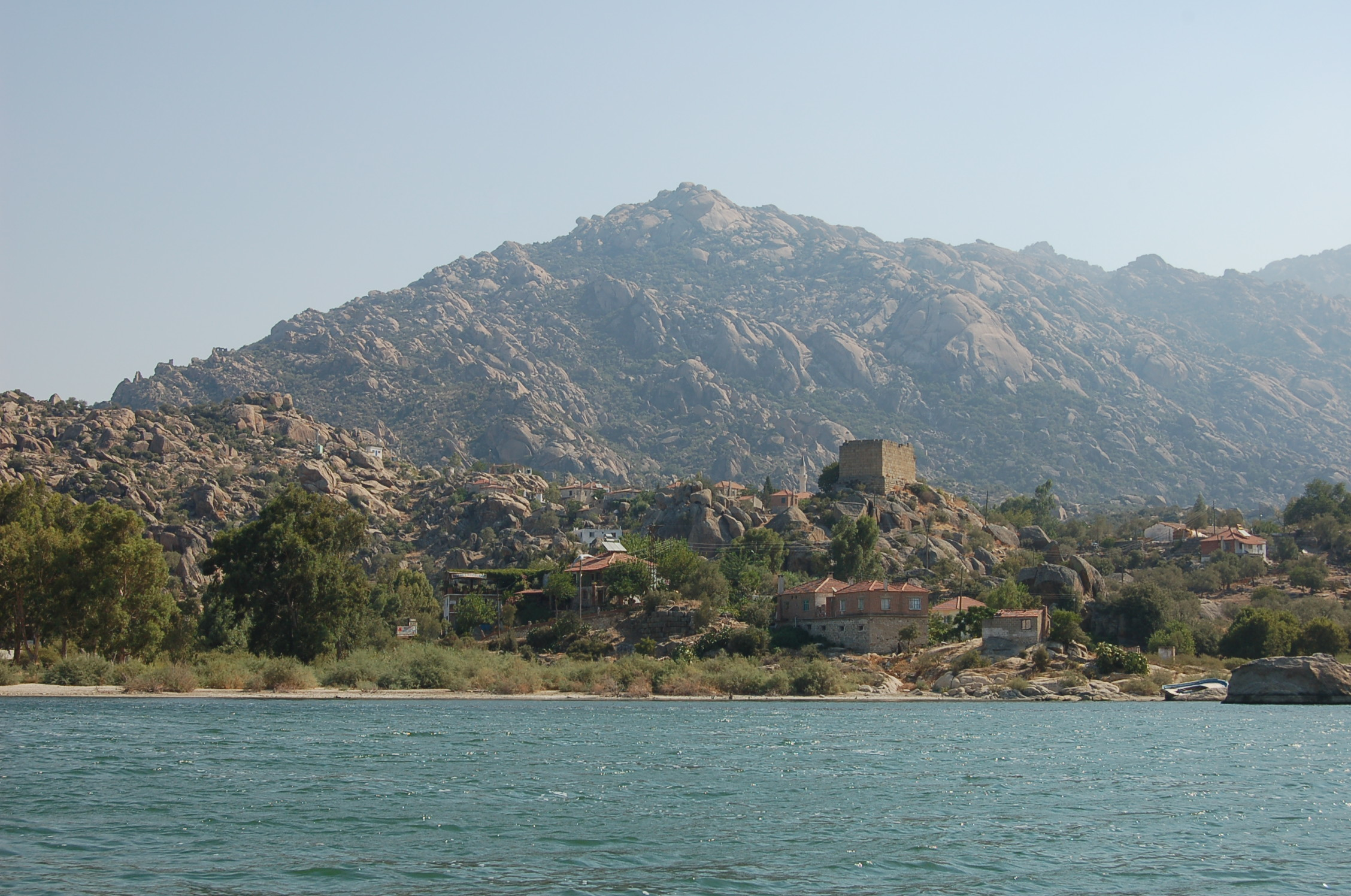
- Mount Latmus and the village of Kapıkırı among the ruins of Heracleia, with Lake Bafa in foreground. View is to the north.

Highest point
- Elevation: 1,353 m (4,439 ft)at Tekerlek Tepesi, "the crest of the hub"
- Coordinates: 37°29′53.19″N 27°31′36.51″E

Naming
- English translation: Five-finger mountain/range
- Language of name: Turkish language

Geography
- Location within Turkey
- Location: Muğla Province, Republic of Turkey
- Parent range: Beşparmak Dağlari at the southern edge of the Menderes Massif

Geology
- Mountain type(s): Ridge with multiple spurs, six major ones

Climbing
- Easiest route: Hike

Beşparmak Mountains (Latin: Latmus; Ancient Greek: Λάτμος, romanized: Latmos) are a ridge of many spurs located in the Muğla and Aydın provinces of Turkey, running in an east–west direction along the north shore of the former Latmian Gulf on the coast of Caria, which became part of Hellenised Ionia. The city of Latmus, located on the south slopes of Mount Latmus 25 kilometres (16 mi) east of Miletus, was originally a port on the narrow gulf, as reported by Strabo. He also states that Latmus is the same as Mount Phthires in the Catalogue of Trojans.

The mouth of the Gulf of Latmus began to fill with sediment from the Maeander (Büyük Menderes) river, which emptied into it, even in classical antiquity. By 300 CE Lake Bafa had formed behind the estuary marshes. It gradually diminished in salinity and would now be fresh water except that canals to the Aegean introduce a saline element. The ecology remains a brackish-water one and the lake has been made a bird sanctuary. Its area of 7 square kilometres (2.7 mi^{2}) with a maximum depth of 25 metres (82 ft) still extends from the base of the west spur of Mount Latmus, although, having lost its port, the ancient medium-sized town of Heraclea ad Latmum has declined in size and facilities to the small village of Kapikiri.

Beşparmak looms far beyond Kapikiri to the east for a total distance of about 35 kilometres (22 mi), 5 kilometres (3.1 mi) to 10 kilometres (6.2 mi) wide. It is deeply eroded by various streams into spurs. The spur that can be seen from Kapikiri is one Dağ, or "mountain", but the entire ridge with all the spurs is Dağlar, "mountains", in the sense of "range." The ancient writers generally recognized the western spur over the gulf as Latmus, but Strabo reports that the ridge east was called Mount Grium and extended through Caria.

== Geology ==
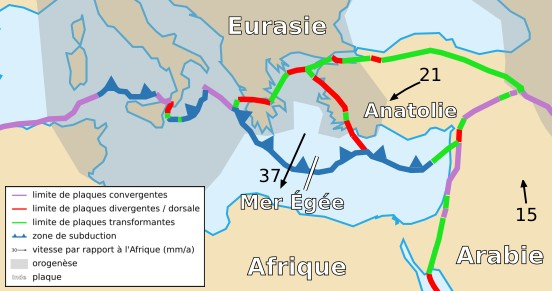
The Arabian plate at 15 converges into the Anatolian Plate at 21 against the purple line (East Anatolian Fault). The Anatolian Plate moves west slipping along the North Anatolian Fault (green) but there is some north–south extension along the red border, which continues into the Aegean Plate at 37. It is opening the old subduction zone and uncovering the massifs, which have arisen as the Cyclades and the Menderes Massif.

The morphotectonic configuration of Anatolia and the Aegean is a result of continental drift movements associated with the Alpine orogeny, a zone of mountain-building caused by the collision of the African and Arabian Plates with the Eurasian Plate. The former have been slipping under the latter compressing and lifting the edge and creating zones of metamorphic rock from previous layers of sedimentary rock. These zones in the Aegean are represented by a number of massifs that were originally buried by crustal subduction: the Rhodope, Kazdag, Menderes, Cycladic Massif and Crete.

For various geologic reasons, modelled differently by different geologists, the zone of compression in the Aegean became one of extension: the region widened and dome-like or ovoid massifs were uncovered, or exhumed, from the subduction zones and rose by isostasy. In the case of the Menderes Massif, which is 40,000 km^{2} (15,444.1 sq mi), the reasons are better known due to geologic research in central Turkey. Anatolia is a triangular block created by the intersection in central Turkey of the North and East Anatolian faults. As the northward-pressing Arabian Plate pushes against this wedge the latter slips to the west but the broad end opens along fault lines like the rays of a fan, extending the massif to the north-northeast and south. This is being called a bivergent (diverges in two places) model.

The entire massif is divided or nearly so by a karst topography into three sections: the Gordes Massif north of the Alasehir or Gediz graben, the Cine Massif south of the Büyük Menderes graben and the Central Massif between. The latter is split like a forked tongue by the Küçük Menderes Graben into the Kuzey Detachment to the north and the Guney Detachment to the south. Mycale is part of the Guney Detachment, while Latmus is in the Cine Massif.

The Graben are low-key rift valleys. There have been some small intrusions of magma into the graben appearing now as granito-diorite outcrops. Dates on thin sections of monazite obtained from the earliest exhumed rocks of the graben suggest "... that the Cenozoic extension in the Gordes Massif, and possibly the entire Menderes Massif, might have begun in the Late Oligocene." Despite the rare intrusions, the massif is not of volcanic origin. Most of the visible layer is light, metamorphic rock of various kinds, especially marble and schists.

Except for alluvial fans of impermeable clay the rock is highly porous due to a network of small faults, which dips into the warmer regions below the surface. Warm springs and vapors are common, giving the appearance of volcanic activity. The ancients cross-culturally viewed these phenomena as being caused by divinities, which rock-paintings indicate they worshipped. The north slopes of Latmus are subject to heavy and damaging mudslides, which also would have contributed to the idea that it was a god.

== Mythology ==
Latmus is probably alluded to by Homer, when he speaks of the mountain of the Phthirians, in the neighbourhood of Miletus. Latmus appears in Greek mythology as the site of the cave where Selene's consort Endymion lies forever young and beautiful in blissful sleep.

== Prehistory ==
Beginning in 1994 about 170 rock paintings have been discovered in shallow caves and overhangs near springs at the foot of Mount Latmus overlooking Lake Bafa. They came to light in a survey conducted by Anneliese Peschlow of the German Archaeology Institute. Peschlow dates the earliest to about 6000 BCE and believes from other findings that the region has been continuously occupied since then. She is currently working to get Mount Latmus reserved as a national park.

The paintings, which are done entirely in red, depict mainly social and religious scenes. Different representations of the mountain include a dragon, indicating that it was worshipped as a god; that is, Latmus was a sacred mountain at least as early as the Early Bronze Age.

A 2004 palynological study of two sediment cores taken from Lake Bafa near Kapikiri (Baf S1) and from the western depth (Baf S6) suggests a habitation sequence of the Büyük Menderes River valley and the shores of Latmus that appears to support the early history of the region. Baf S1, containing the oldest sediment, is layered in four subsections, the first carbon dated to before 4000 BCE.

From the pollen of subsection 1 a model can be constructed of a lightly grazed climax forest of deciduous oak and pine: 27.6% Quercus pubescens, 14.6% Pinus and lesser concentrations of Isoetes histrix. Low levels of the pasture weed, Plantago lanceolata, indicate a low level of grazing by animals belonging to indigenes that lived somewhere else. There is no evidence that they settled or grew crops in the region.

Location of Mount Latmus south of Maeander River's mouth.

Subsection 2, dated 1240/1126 BCE to 710/558 BCE, represents a settlement from the Beyşehir Occupation Phase of southern Anatolia, dated there 3500/3000 BP to 1500 BP. It has a specific palynological profile of "secondary anthropogenic indicators;" that is, not pollen of cultivated plants but of other species growing on cultivated land: certain percentages of Plantago lanceolata, Sanguisorba minor, Pistacia, Platanus, Quercus calliprinos and Juniperus.

The Lake Bafu profile shows the replacement of deciduous oak and pine with maquis species: Phillyrea, Cistus, Ericaceae; fruit trees: Olea, Castanea; and farm weeds: Plantago lanceolata and Juniperus. Carbon in the sediment suggests the forest was cleared by slash and burn. This period corresponds to the settlement of the Carians in the area, who apparently moved in from southern Anatolia. There is a semi-legendary tradition that they subdued another Pre-Hellenic people, the Leleges, but the evidence is not precise enough to say if the indigenes were all or partly Leleges. As the Carians worshipped Endymion, he may have been brought in at this time.

Subsection 3 reveals an abandonment of the cleared areas, the decline of Olea, and the spread of Pistacia, Pinus brutia and Quercus coccifera (instead of deciduous oak) on formerly cleared land and in the maquis. As this is the time of the rise of Ionia, the palynological scenario suggests a movement of population from the land to the newly settled or expanded big cities of the Ionian League. Subsection 4 and Baf S6 go on to catalogue the return of the fruit trees, re-clearing the land for pasture, planting of rye and other cereals, ultimate destabilization of the soil through over-use, denudation and acceleration of sedimentation. After the sealing off of the bay to form the lake, population and land use declined to their current low levels around Latmus, but the river valley is cultivated.

== History ==
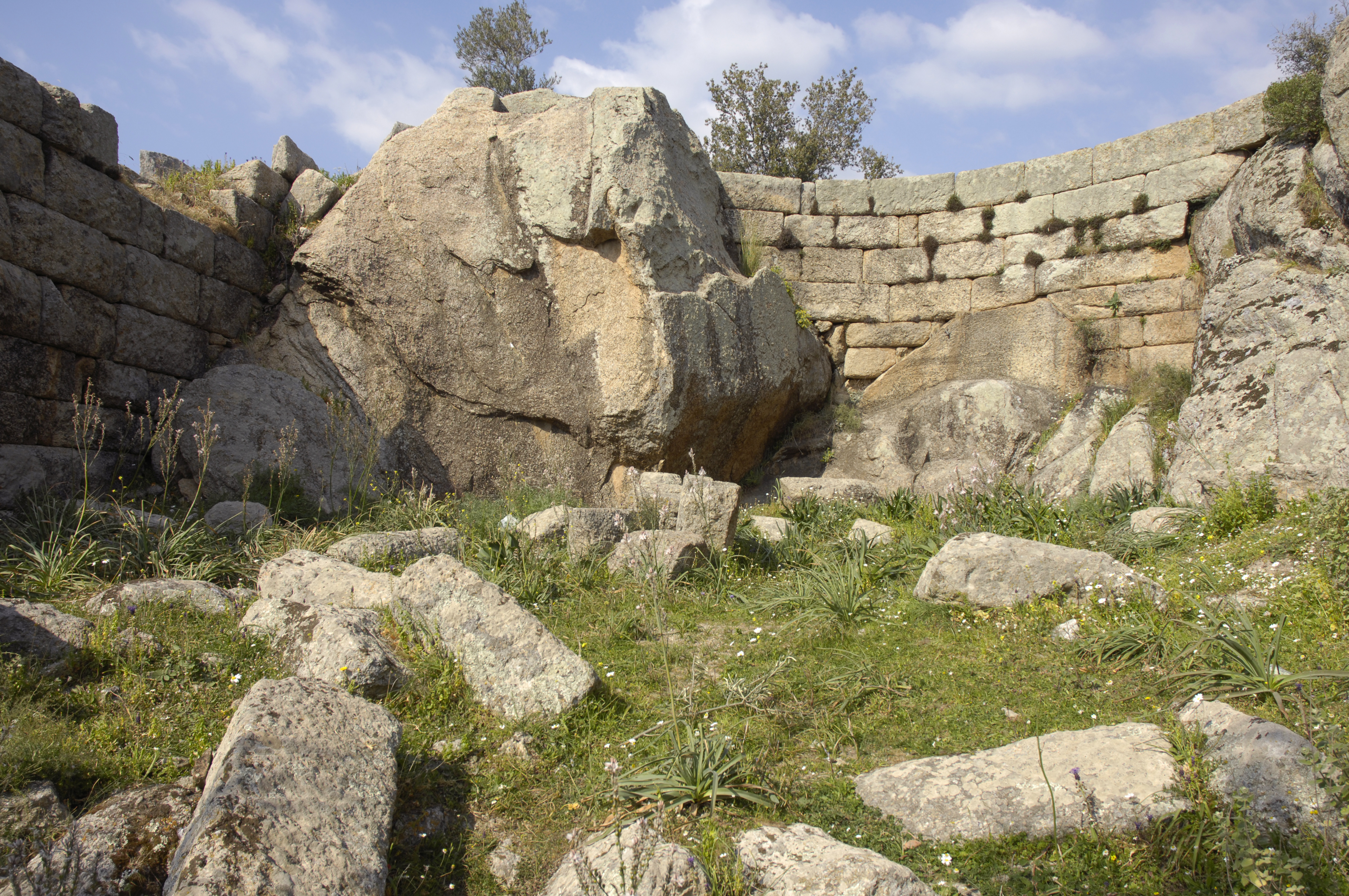
Endymion temple in Heracleia

Latmus became a member of the Delian League in the fifth century BCE. In the fourth century the Persian satrap (a Carian) Mausolus of Halicarnassus captured the city by a ruse and fortified it with a circuit wall; under Hellenising influence the city was refounded a kilometer to the west on a rectilinear grid system as Heracleia under Latmos, dedicated to the hero Heracles. The modern village of Kapıkırı is built among the ruins.

The temenos, or sanctuary of Endymion, with pre-Greek origins, was rebuilt in Hellenistic times, and may still be seen on a rise to the south of the ancient city. The building faces the southwest; it has a cella with a horseshoe-shaped rear wall partly cut out of the bedrock, with an entrance hall and columned forecourt.

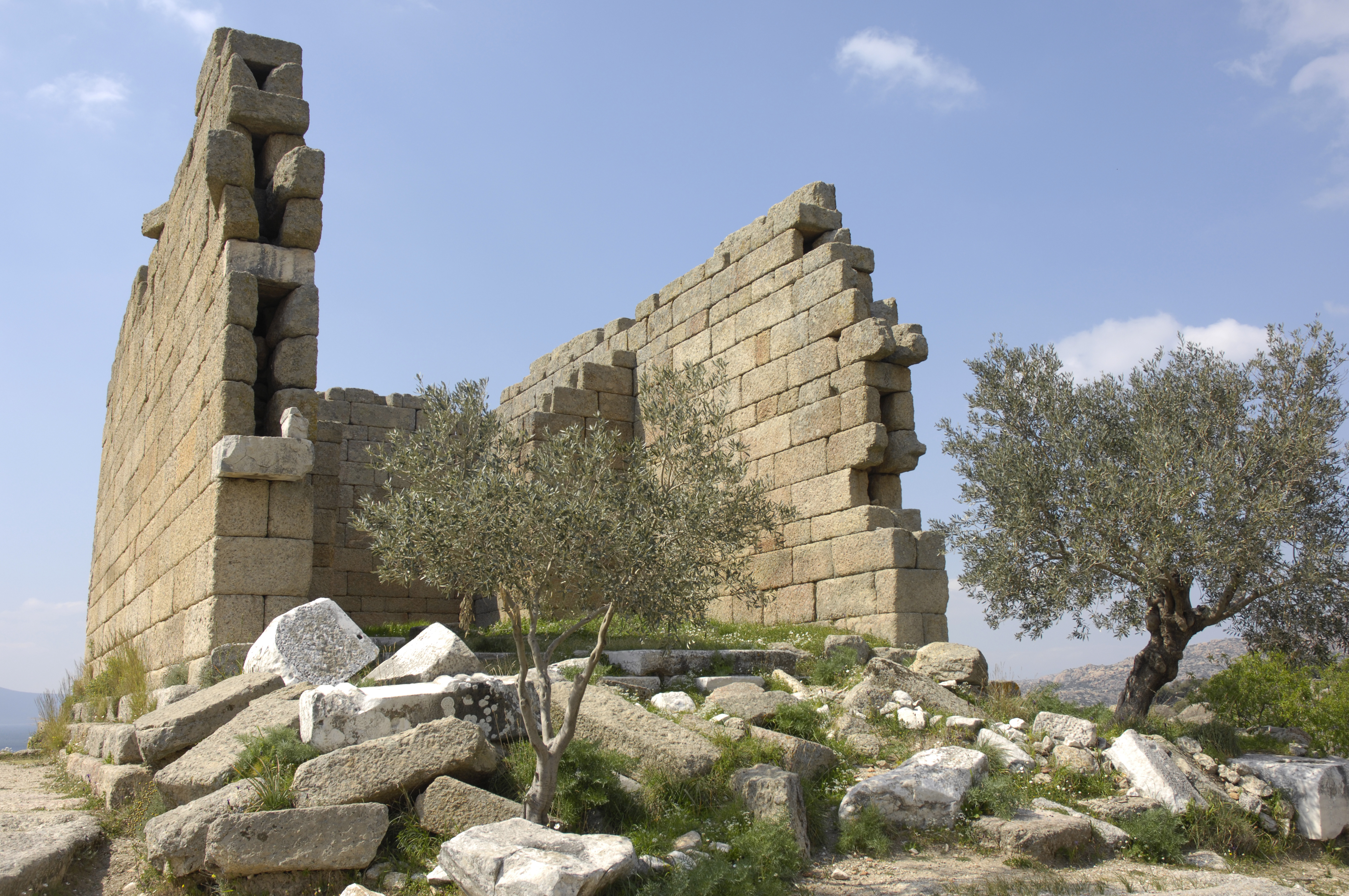
Heracleia's temple of Athena

A temple of Athena at Heracleia reveals its earlier foundation by not being aligned with the Hellenistic street pattern.

In Byzantine times, the mountain, known as Latros, became a flourishing monastic centre. According to tradition, the first monastic community was established by Sinaite monks fleeing from the Muslim conquests in the 7th century. In the 9th century, Joseph the Hymnographer was tonsured in the monastery of Latmus. By the early 10th century, there were three monasteries. Paul of Latrus was a hermit who lived on the mountain during the 10th century. By 1222, the monastic community of Latros numbered 11 monasteries. However, it began declining towards the end of the 13th century due to increasing Turkish attacks, and disappeared in the 14th century. Endymion was Christianised as a mystic saint, whose coffin was opened annually and whose bones emitted musical tones and the site drew pilgrims.

Iron ore was mined in the area as of the early 20th century.

In 2018, four kilometers of the ancient stone road, which connects the ancient cities of Alinda and Latmus, have been destroyed by villagers to make way for their olive groves.

== Gallery ==
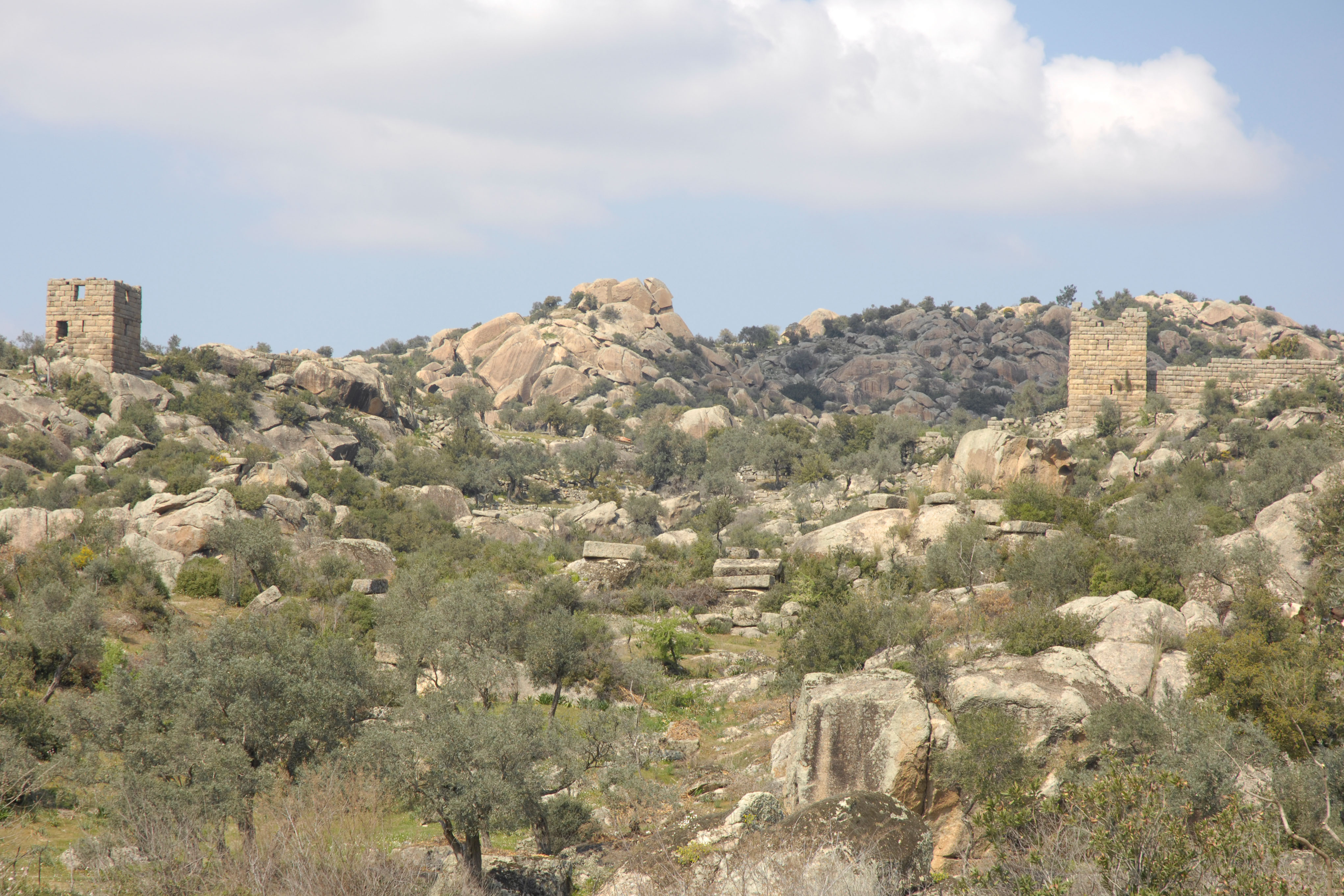
Herakleia at Latmus – Defensive towers

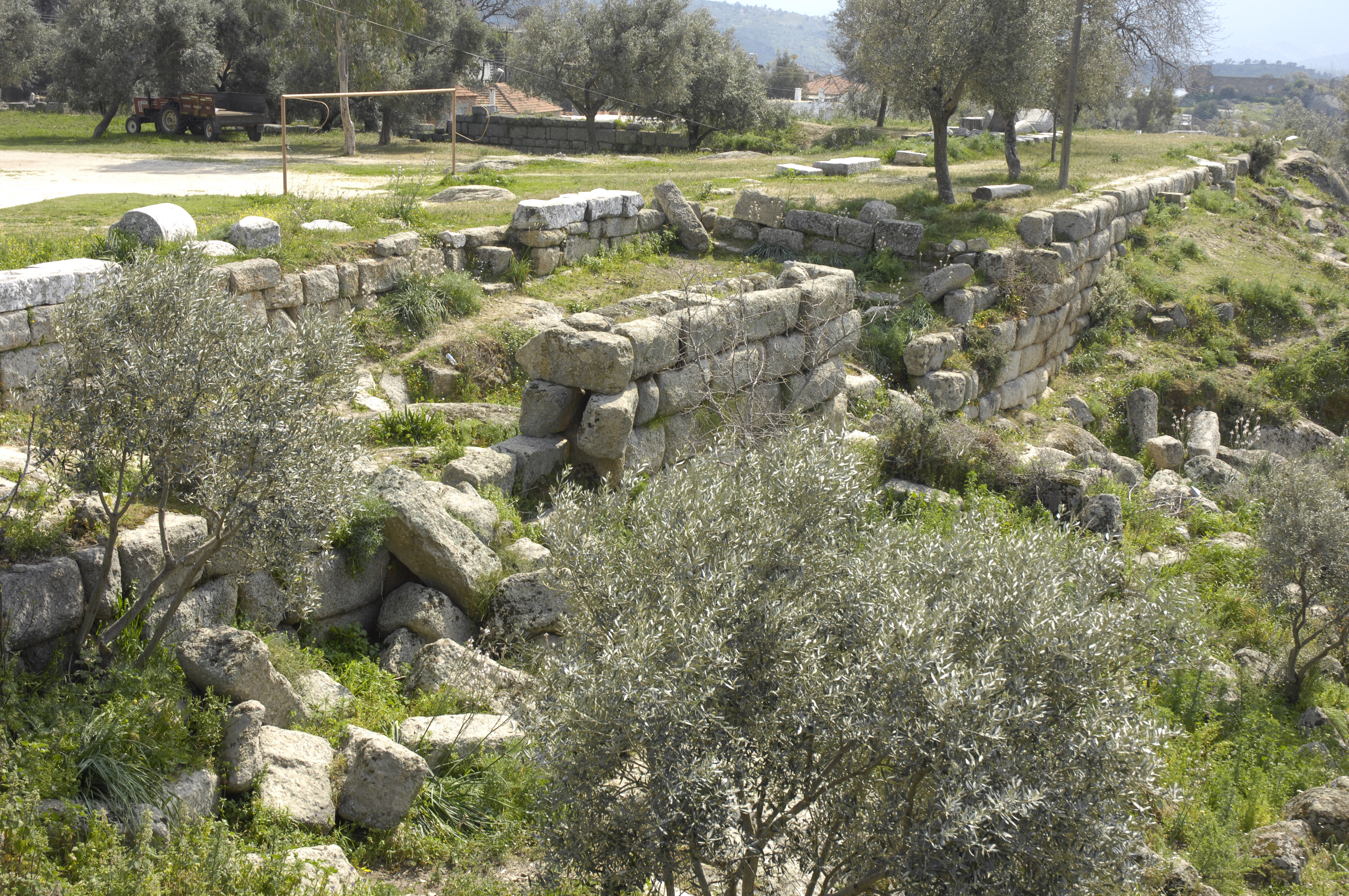
Herakleia at Latmus – Agora

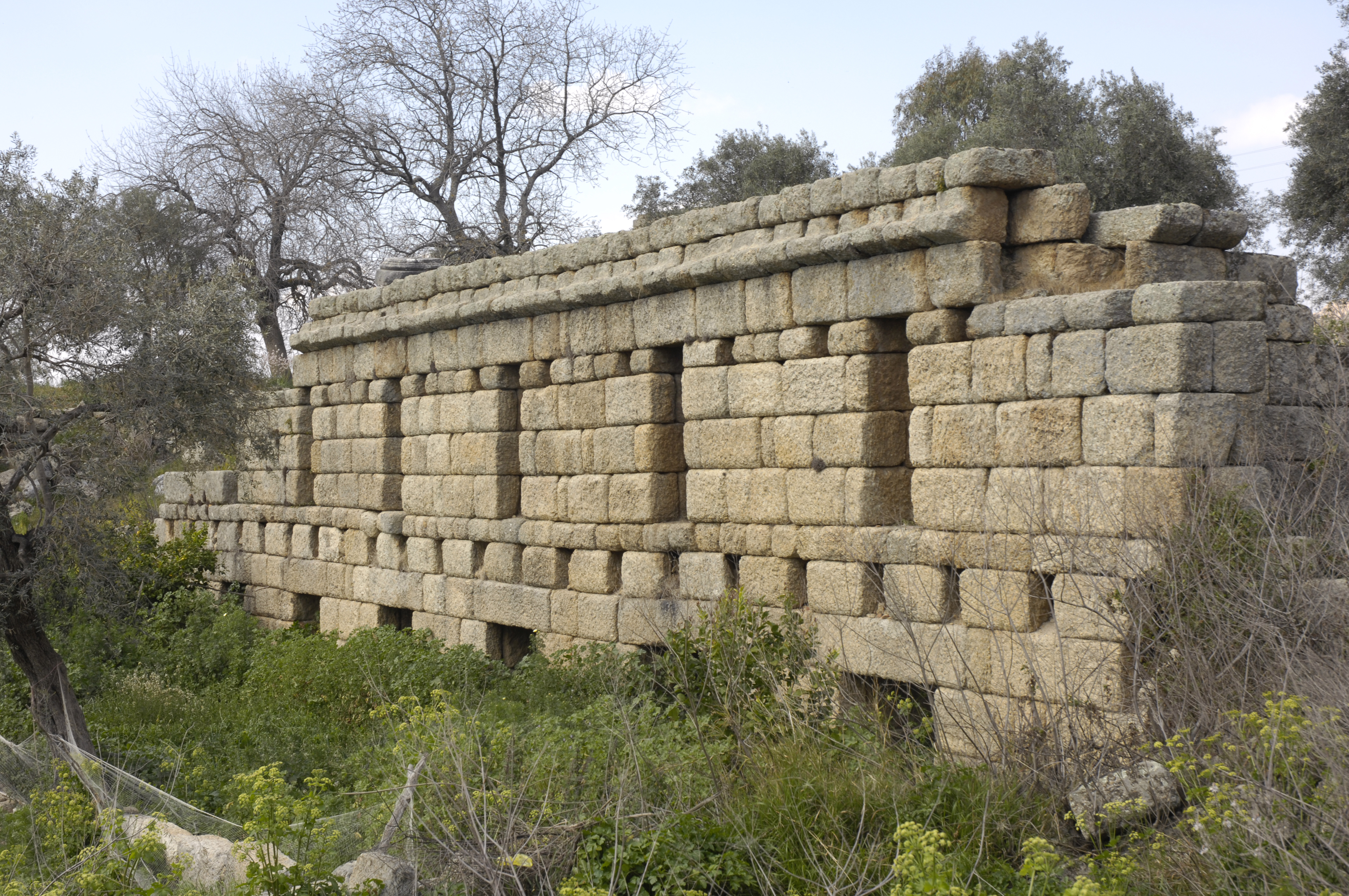
Herakleia at Latmus – Stonework supporting the agora

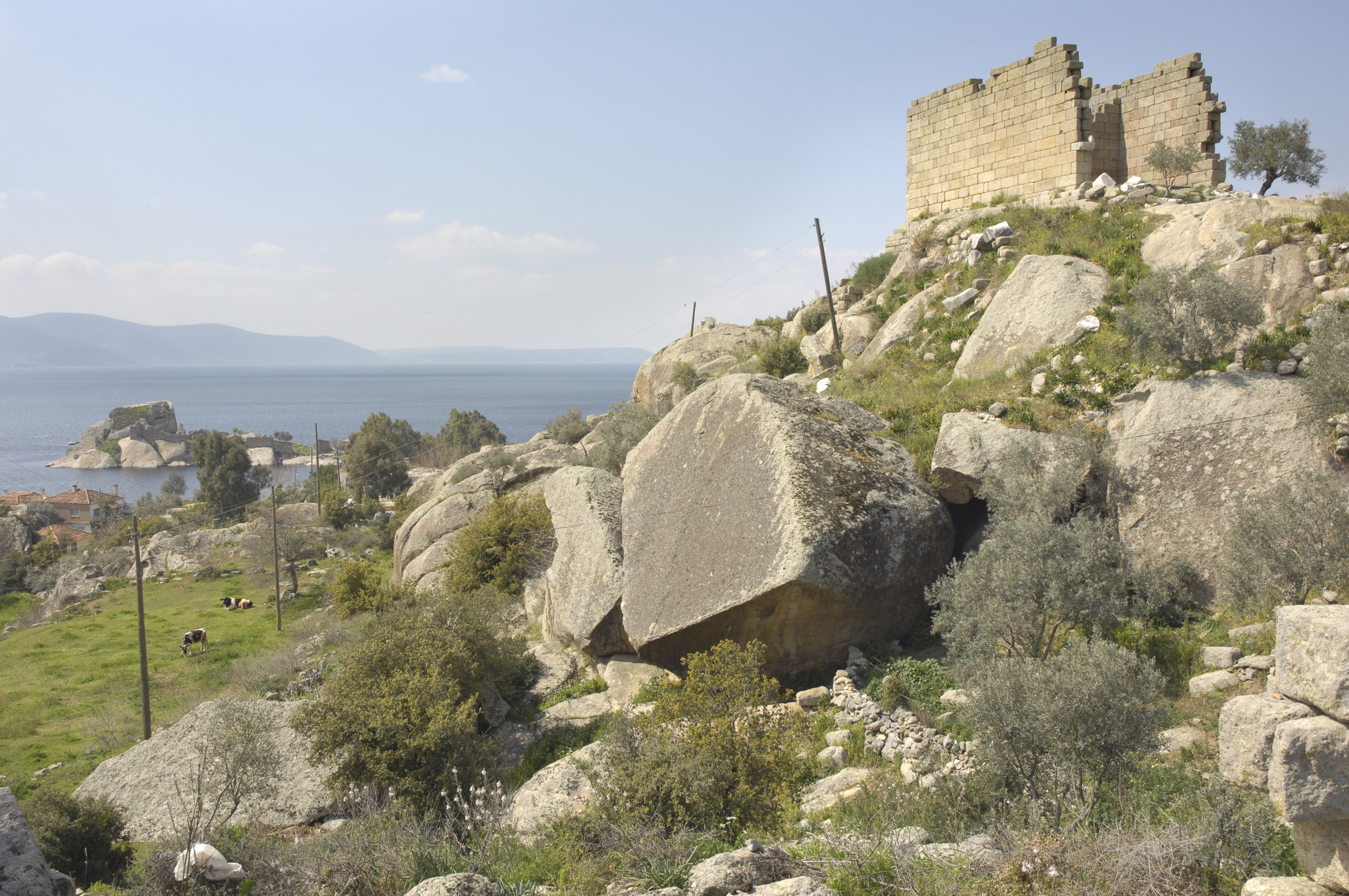
Herakleia at Latmus – The temple of Athena viewed from the agora

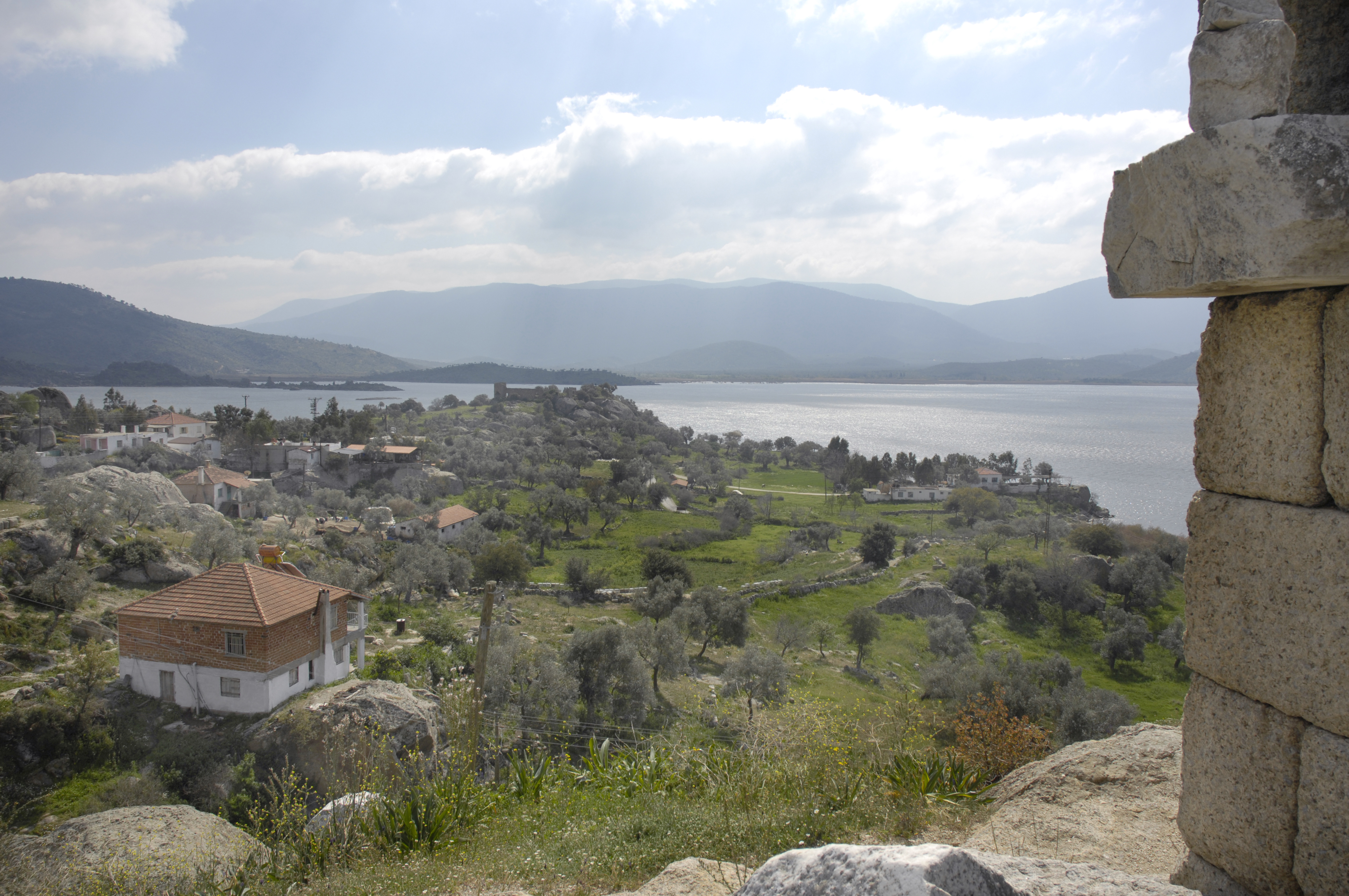
Herakleia at Latmus – View towards Byzantine castle from temple of Athena

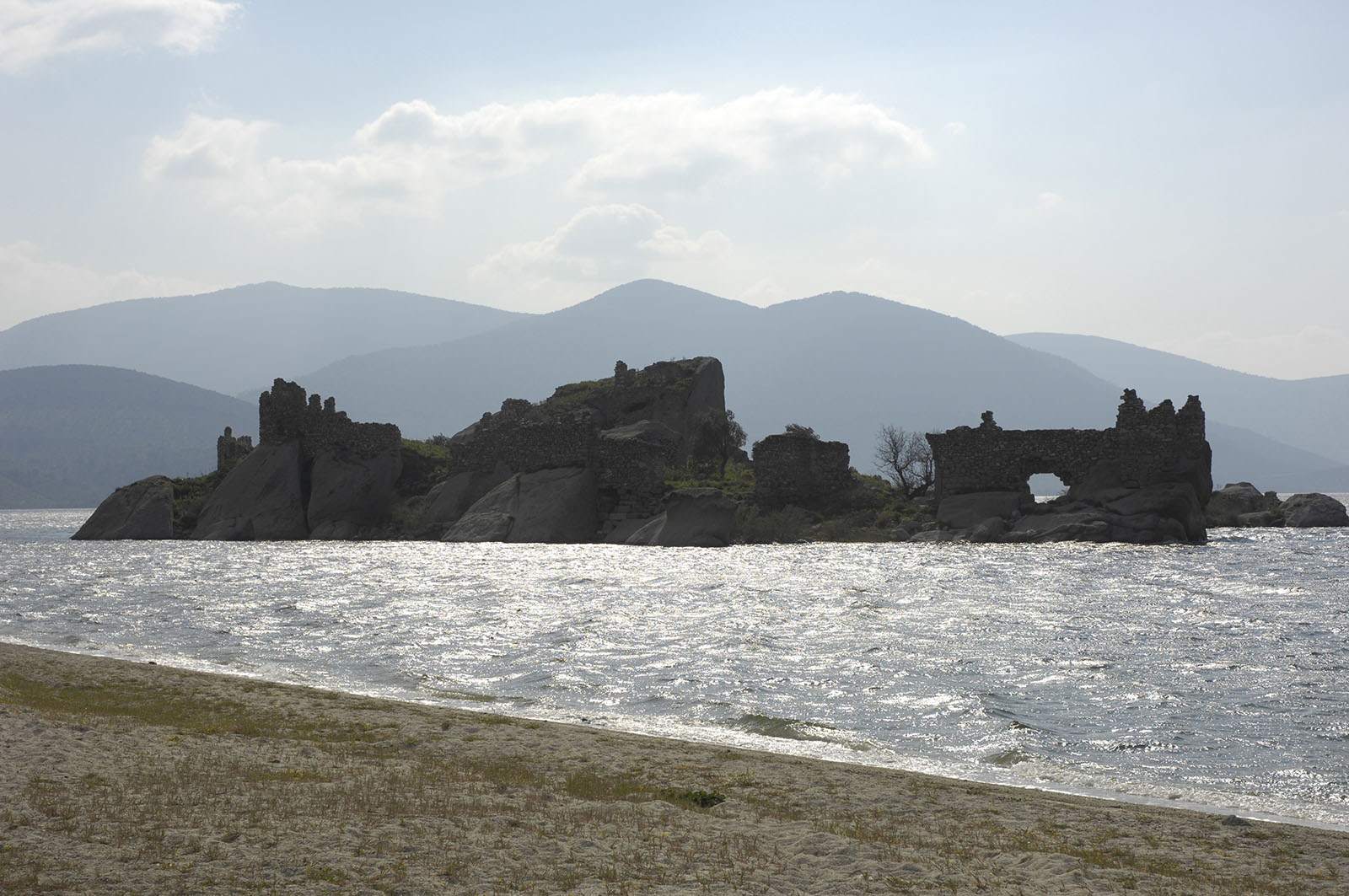
Herakleia at Latmus – Monastery on island in Lake Bafa

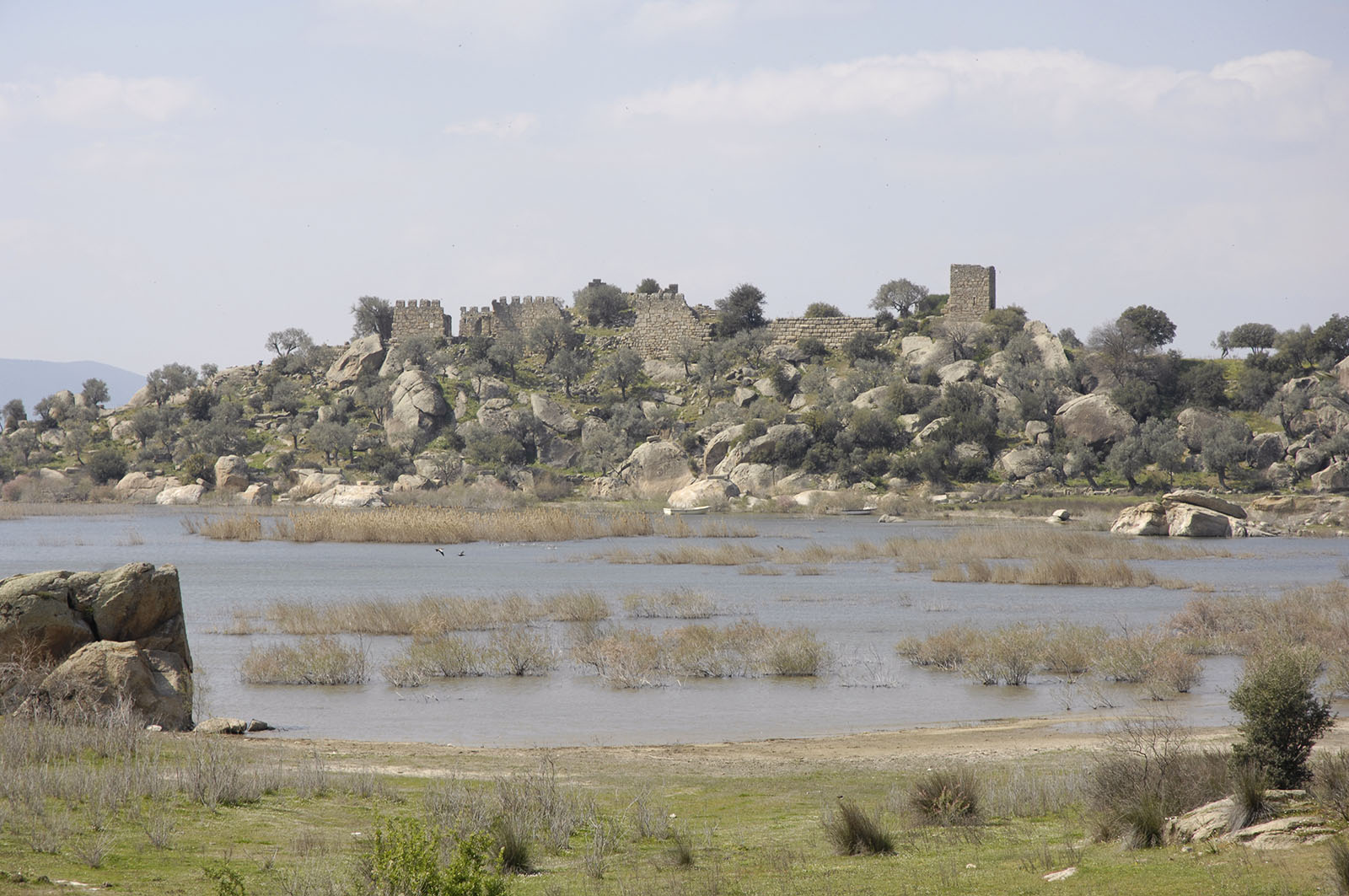
Herakleia at Latmus – Byzantine Castle

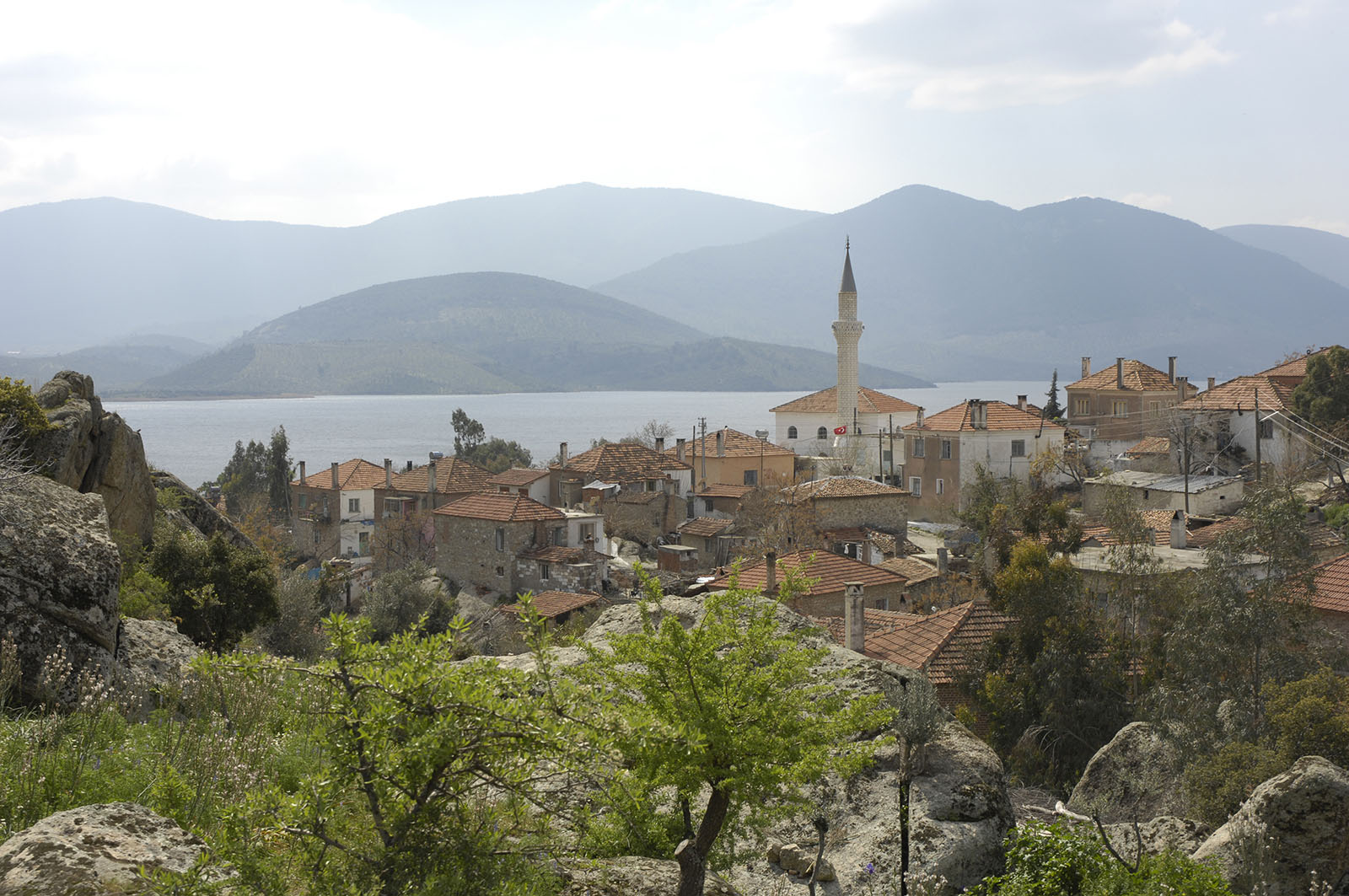
Kapiri village with Lake Bafa in the background

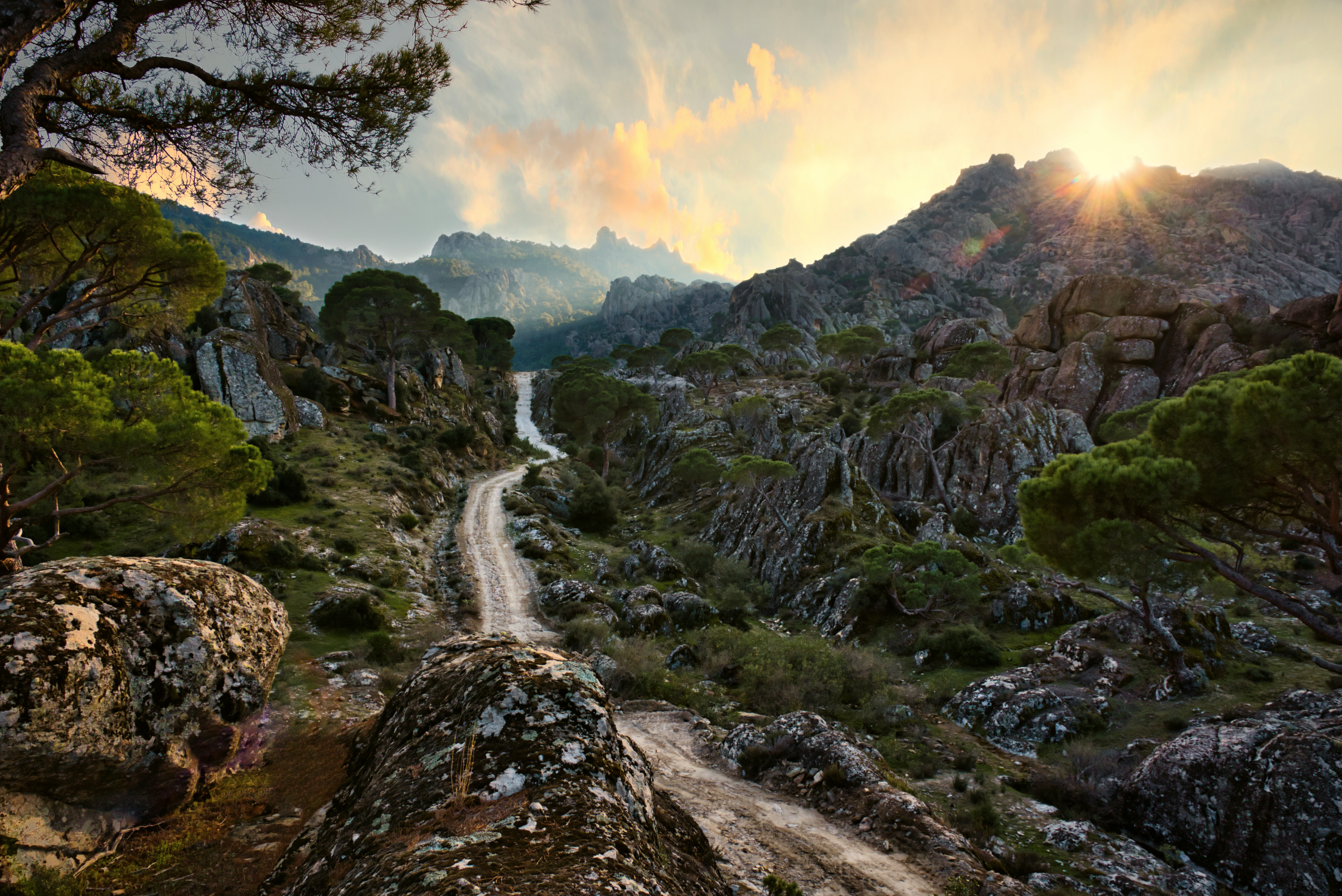
Sakarkaya, Latmos Mountains, Turkey.

== See also ==
- Carians
- Leleges § Leleges in Anatolia
