= Thydonos =

Town of ancient Caria

Thydonos was a town of ancient Caria, mentioned by Pliny the Elder. Thydonos was a member of the Delian League since it appears in tribute records of Athens for 451/0 BCE.

Its site is unlocated, but Pliny's recitation of Thydonos among Euromus, Heraclea, Amyzon, and Alabanda, indicates that it was in the northern part of Caria.
