= Paul of Latrus =

Greek Christian hermit (? - c. 956)

Saint Paul of Latrus
- Born: Pergamon (modern-day Turkey)
- Residence: Mount Latrus near Miletus (modern-day Balat, Didim, Aydın, Turkey)
- Died: 956; Samos
- Feast: 20 December

Saint Paul of Latrus (or Paul of Latra; died c. 956) was a Greek hermit. His feast day is 20 December.

== Life ==
Saint Paul of Latrus spent most of his religious life as a hermit on Mount Latrus near the city of Miletus in Caria (now western Turkey). He later founded a monastery on Mount Latrus.

He generally avoided the powerful and preferred the company of humble people, but he received letters from Tsar Peter I of Bulgaria, and wrote to the emperor urging the removal of Manichaeans from the territories of Kibyrrhaeotis and Miletus. A large number of disciples gathered around him, and to avoid them he moved to the island of Samos.

He died in 955 or 956.

== Monks of Ramsgate account ==
The monks of St Augustine's Abbey, Ramsgate, wrote in their Book of Saints (1921),

Paul of Latra (St.) (Dec. 20)
(10th century) A holy hermit in Greece, spiritual father of many monks and in great honour in the East. He died A.D. 956.

== Nikephoros the Monk ==
Paul of Latrus was mentioned in Nikephoros the Monk's work On Watchfulness and the Guarding of the Heart, which was later included in the Philokalia. He mentions that:

Although the divine Paul always lived in the mountains and in desert places, and shared his solitude and his food with wild animals, there were nevertheless times when he went down to the Lavra in order to visit the brethren. He counselled them, exhorting them not to be fainthearted and not to neglect the assiduous practice of the virtues, but to persevere with all attentiveness and discrimination in their efforts to live according to the Gospels and in their courageous fight against the spirits of evil. He also taught them a method by which they could expunge ingrained passion-imbued dispositions as well as counteract new seeds of passion.

== Butler's account ==
The hagiographer Alban Butler (1710–1773) wrote in his Lives of the Fathers, Martyrs, and Other Principal Saints, under July 1,

December 20

St. Paul of Latrus, or Latra, Hermit

THE FATHER of this saint, who was an officer in the imperial army, being slain on board the Grecian fleet, in an engagement with the Mahometans, his mother Eudocia retired from Pergamus, in Asia, which was the place of his nativity, into Bithynia, taking her two sons with her. Basil, who was the eldest, rejecting the proposal of an advantageous match, took the monastic habit upon Mount Olympus in that country; but soon after, for the sake of greater solitude, retired to the laura founded by St. Elias, and afterwards to Brachiana, near Mount Latrus. When their mother was dead, he engaged his younger brother to embrace the same state of life. Though young, he had experienced the world sufficiently to understand the emptiness and dangers of its enjoyments. He saw that even if it bestows on a man all things that it can give, he is only like a rich man who is possessed of stately houses, abundance of gold and silver, and enjoys all manner of attendance; yet is afflicted with inward pains and distempers, under which neither the whole tribe of his relations, nor his riches, nor strength, nor diversions can ease his pains: nothing at least of all this can cleanse him from sin. But the more this visible world, and the false rest which it affords, seem to cherish the body, so much the more do they sharpen the disorders of the soul, and increase her illness. This the pious youth seriously considered, and resolved to disengage himself from the cares of this life, and devote himself to the Lord, crying to him night and day. Basil recommended our saint to the care and instruction of the abbot of Carya on the top of Mount Latrus, and returning himself to Mount Olympus, he died abbot of the laura of St. Elias.

Paul was indefatigable in the exercise of holy prayer, and having no other desire than to gain heaven, laboured seriously to subdue his body by mortification. He never lay down to sleep, but only leaned his head against a stone or tree. No unprofitable word was ever heard from his mouth: and the sight of the fire, which put him in mind of hell, drew tears from his eyes without intermission whenever he was employed in the kitchen. It was his desire, for the sake of greater solitude and austerity, to lead an eremitical life; but his abbot thinking him too young, refused him leave so long as he lived; but this he obtained after his death. His first cell was a cave on the highest part of Mount Latrus, where, for some weeks, he had no other subsistence than green acorns, which caused him at first to vomit even to blood. After eight months he was called back by the abbot to Carya, but soon after allowed to pursue his vocation, and chose a new habitation on the highest and most craggy part of the mountain. The first three years he suffered most grievous temptations; but overcame them by steadiness in his exercises, and especially by assiduous prayer. A countryman sometimes brought him a little coarse food; but he mostly lived on what grew wild on the mountain. At first he wanted water; but God produced a spring with a constant stream near his dwelling. The reputation of his sanctity being spread through the neighbouring provinces, several persons chose to live near him, and built there a laura of cells. Paul, who had been careless of himself as to all corporal necessaries, was solicitous that no provisions should be wanting to those that lived under his direction. After twelve years, regretting to see his solitude too much broken into, he secretly withdrew into a wild part of the mountains, where he had no company but that of wild beasts. However, he visited his brethren from time to time, to comfort and encourage them; and he sometimes led them into the forests to sing the divine praises together. Being once asked why he appeared sometimes joyful, at other times sad, he answered: “When nothing diverts my thoughts from God, my heart swims in excess of overflowing joy, insomuch that I often forget my food, and all earthly things; but it is an affliction to live amidst the distraction of worldly conversation.”

On certain necessary occasions he disclosed something of the wonderful communications which passed between his soul and God, and of the heavenly favours which he received in contemplation. Desiring to find a closer retirement, he passed to the isle of Samos, and there concealed himself in a cave upon Mount Cerces. But he was soon discovered, and many flocking to him, he reestablished three lauras, which had been ruined by the Saracens in that island. The importunate entreaties of the monks of his laura at Latrus prevailed upon him to return to his former cell on the top of that mountain. There he lived in the practice of penance and contemplation, but refused not instructions to those that desired them. The emperor Constantine Porphyrogenetta wrote frequently to him, asked his advice in affairs of importance, and had always reason to repent when he did not follow it. Popes, bishops, and princes often sent messages to him. Such was his tenderness for the poor, that he gave them every part of his own coarse meat and clothes which it was in his power to retrench: and once he would have sold himself for a slave to procure assistance for certain persons in deep distress, had he not been prevented. Towards the end of his life he drew up rules for his laura. On the 6th of December in 956, foreseeing that his death drew near, he came down from his cell to his laura, said mass more early than usual, then took to his bed, being seized with a violent fever. He spent his last moments in prayer, and in repeating tender instructions to his monks till his happy death, which fell out on the 15th of December, on which day he is commemorated in the Greek Synaxarium. Papebroke tells us, he found his name in some Greek calendars on the 21st of December. See his life, which is well written, quoted by Leo Allatius, and Jos. Assemani in Cal. Univ. t. 5, p. 467, abridged by Fleury, l. 55, n. 52, t. 12, p. 101, &c.

== Sources ==
- Butler, Alban (1846), The Lives of the Fathers, Martyrs, and Other Principal Saints, D. & J. Sadlier This article incorporates text from this source, which is in the public domain.
- Hamilton, Janet; Hamilton, Bernard; Stoyanov, Yuri (1998), Christian Dualist Heresies in the Byzantine World, C. 650-c. 1450: Selected Sources, Manchester University Press, ISBN 978-0-7190-4765-7
- St. Augustine's Abbey, Ramsgate (1921), The Book of saints : a dictionary of servants of God canonized by the Catholic Church, London: A. & C. Black, ltd. This article incorporates text from this source, which is in the public domain.
