= Latmus (town) =

Ancient polis of Caria

Coordinates: 37°30′08″N 27°32′19″E

Latmus or Latmos (Ancient Greek: Λάτμος) was a town of ancient Caria. It was a polis (city-state) and a member of the Delian League.

Strabo writes that it was also known as "Heracleia below Latmus" (Ancient Greek: Ἡράκλεια ἡ ὑπὸ Λάτμῳ).,

Its site is located near Heraclea ad Latmum, Asiatic Turkey.
