= Morphotectonics =

Branch of geomorphology

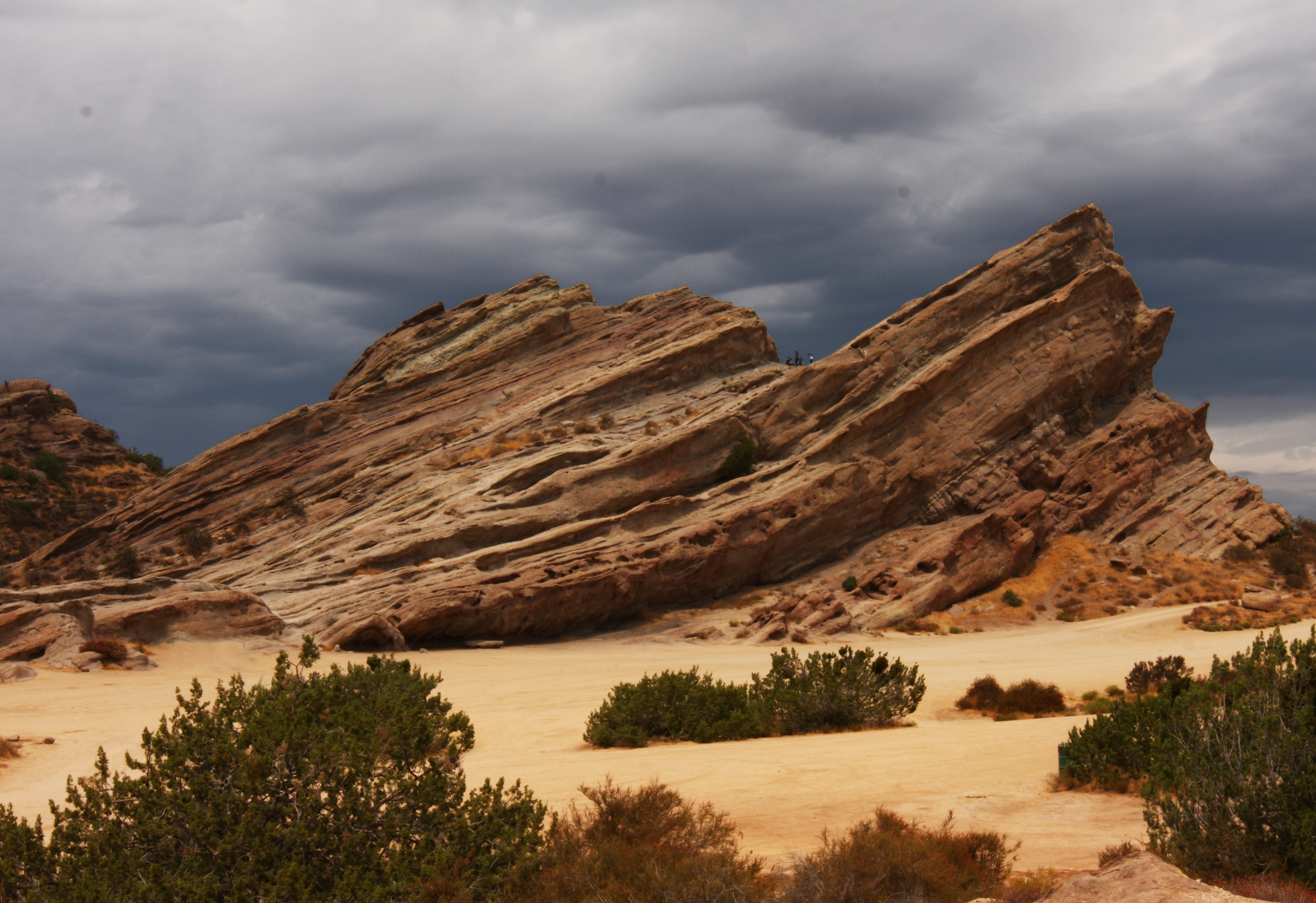
The Vasquez Rock formations, located in the Sierra Pelona Mountains, were formed by tectonic activity along an offshoot of the San Andreas Fault.

Morphotectonics (from Ancient Greek: μορφή, morphḗ, "form"; and τεκτονικός, tektonikos, "pertaining to building"), or tectonic geomorphology, is a branch of geomorphology that studies how landforms are formed or affected by tectonic activity. Morphotectonists seek to understand the deep Earth mechanisms behind the creation of tectonic landforms by processes such as crust uplift, subsidence, faulting, or folding.

Morphotectonics relies on cross-disciplinary research, drawing from fields such as geology, seismology, physical geography, climatology, geochronology, and geodesy. This diversity creates a challenge in that successful morphotectonic studies require combining information from specialized, historically unrelated fields of study. Furthermore, this wide range of fields leads to new discoveries in the field potentially coming from unexpected sources, such as paleobotany or stratigraphy. The field of morphotectonics has been increasingly gaining attention since the 1980s.

== History ==
The study of how landforms are created by inner Earth processes was a topic heavily focused on in the mid-20th century, frequently appearing in geomorphology and geology textbooks. However, the term morphotectonics was not coined until 1961 by Edwin Hills, who defined the field as involving "a study of the external form and outlines of major topographic units...as well as their internal structure". After the 1960s, the field became neglected until a resurgence of morphotectonic literature in the 1980s.

== Tectonic Landforms ==
Tectonic landforms are natural geomorphic landscape features that were formed by tectonic activity. Traditionally, it was believed that many geomorphic landscape features (e.g. valleys, glacial forms, volcanic landscapes, etc.) were formed solely via external, non-tectonic processes, such as water, wind, and ice erosion. However, it is now believed that in almost all cases, geomorphic features were formed by a combination of external and internal mechanisms.

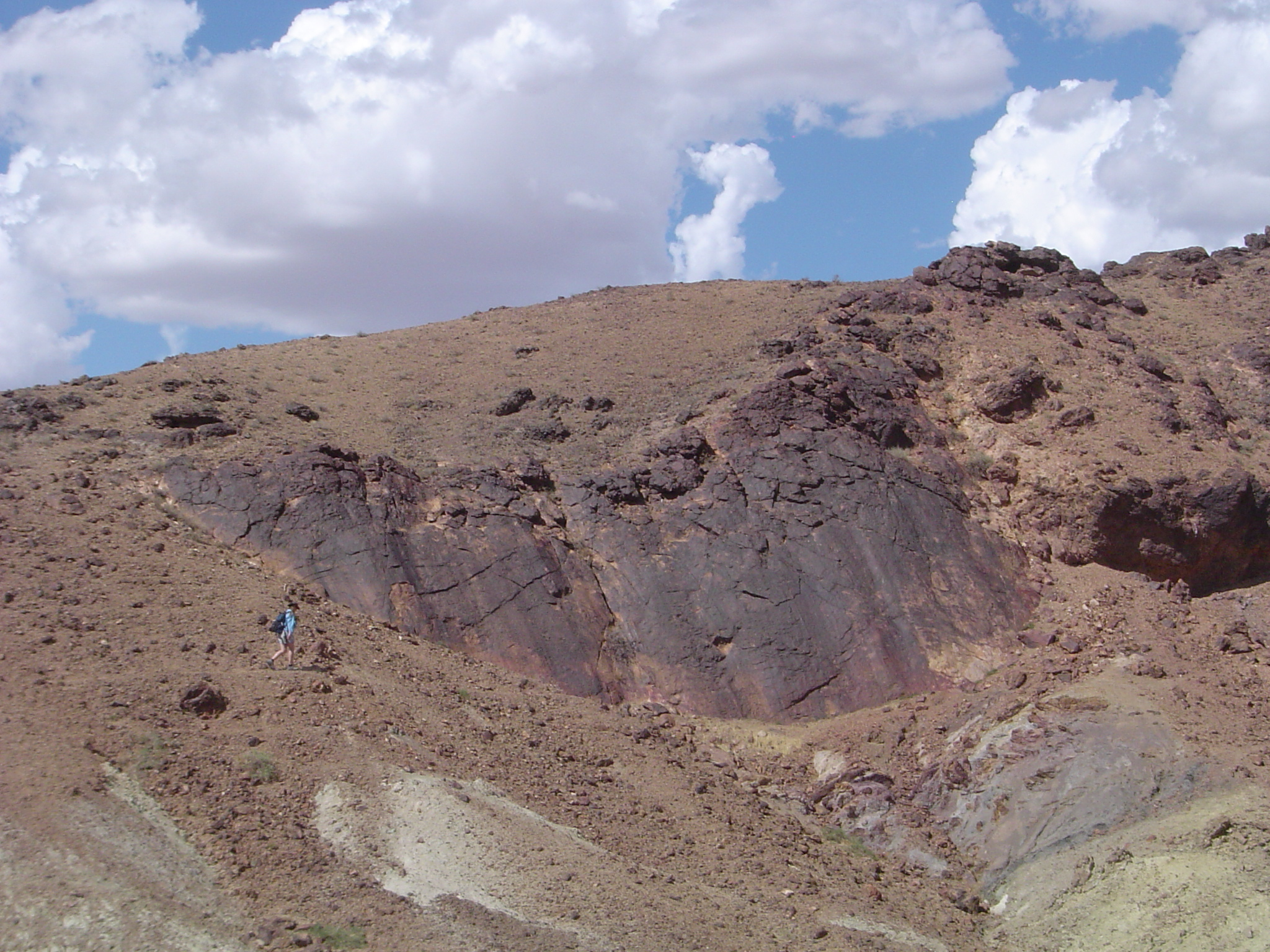
Example of a fault scarp from the Gobi Desert of Mongolia.

=== Fault Scarp ===
A fault scarp is a small step or offset on the ground surface where one side of a fault has moved vertically with respect to the other. Active faulting can cause fault scarps to appear either individually or as multiple subparallel scarps.

=== Valleys ===
Valleys are the low areas lying between mountains or hills in which something flows, typically water, debris, or ice. The customary view is that valleys are carved by running water eroding path through land (in the case of V-shaped valleys), or by glaciers scouring across slopes (in the case of U-shaped valleys); however, there is evidence that rivers and ice follow pre-existing tectonic structures, meaning that valleys are created by both flows and tectonic activity.

== Morphotectonic Methods ==
Traditional morphotectonic methods directly associated landform structure with geologic origin, with little regard to actual geophysical data. In more recent decades, morphotectonists have developed a more analytic approach with the advancement of technologies including the advancement of dating methods, development of new geodetic tools, and the availability digital topographic data along with high-speed computing.
