= Heraclea at Latmus =

Town of ancient Caria and Ionia

Heraclea ad Latmum
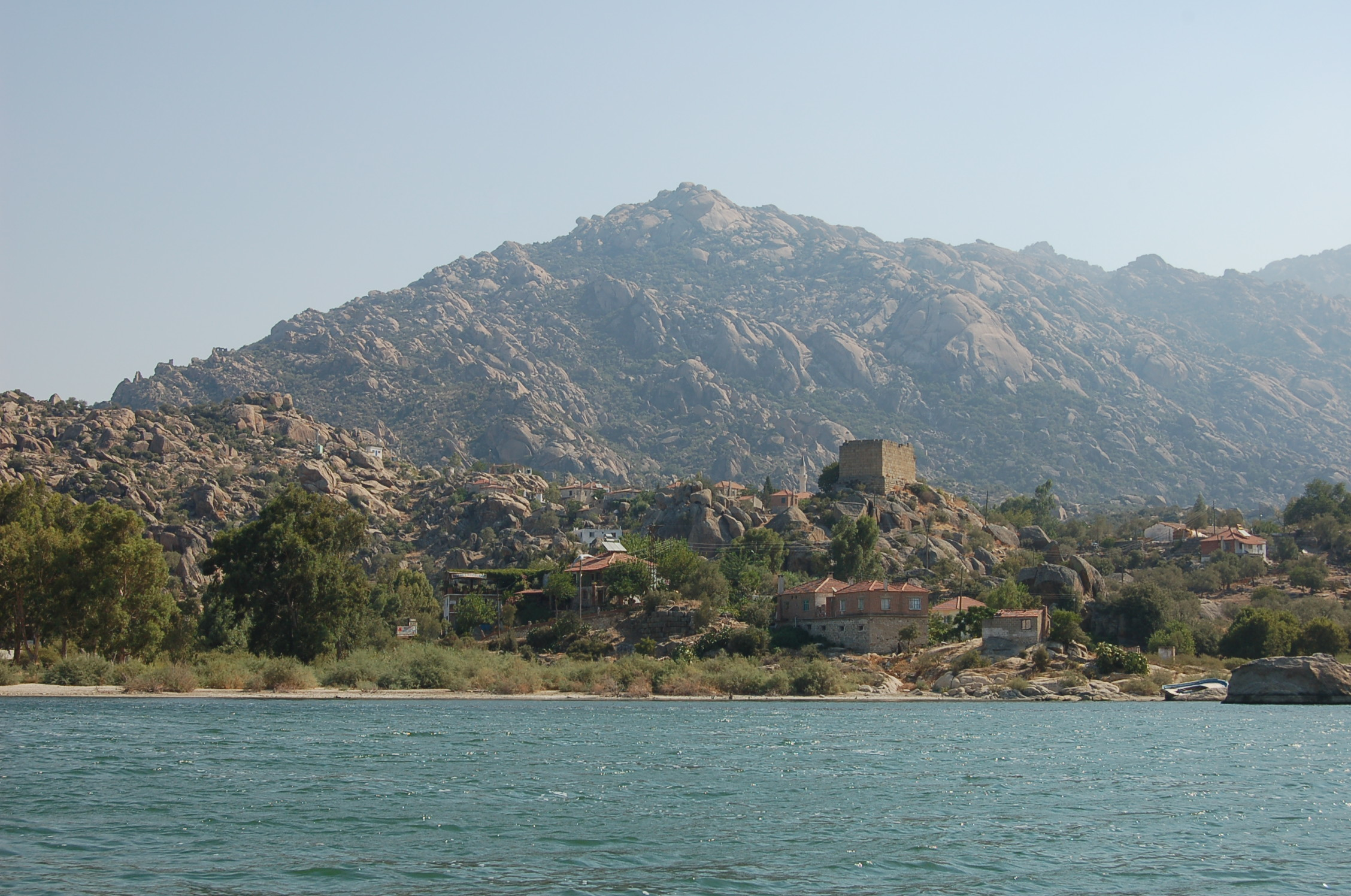
- Ancient Heraclea at the foot of Mt Latmus. At the centre-right is the Hellenistic temple of Athena.

- Location within Turkey
- 37.49759°N 27.52707°E
- Periods: Hellenistic Greece

Heraclea at Latmus or Heraclea under Latmus (Ancient Greek: Ἡράκλεια πρὸς Λάτμῳ or Ἡράκλεια ὑπὸ Λάτμῳ, romanized: Herakleia pros Latmo or Herakleia hupo Latmo; Latin: Heraclea ad Latmum), or simply Heraclea or Herakleia (Ἡράκλεια), also transliterated as Heracleia, was an ancient town situated at the western foot of Mount Latmus, on the border between Caria and Ionia in southwestern Asia Minor (modern Turkey). The site, now occupied by the modern village of Kapıkırı, stands on the shore of Lake Bafa, which in antiquity was part of the Gulf of Latmus before it was silted up by deposits from the river Maeander. Substantial remains of the city and its fortifications still survive.

== History ==
The city, which was known as Latmos during the Archaic and Classical periods, was originally located approximately 1 km east of the later city of Herakleia, where a smaller set of fortifications and remains of houses and other buildings have been found, together with pottery of the 6th and 5th centuries BC. During the 5th century BC Latmos was a member of the Delian League, with a tribute assessment of one talent. The city was conquered by Mausollos in the 4th century BC, and at some point thereafter, probably in the late 4th or early 3rd century BC, a new city was laid out on the site further west and renamed Herakleia. Stephanus of Byzantium records that it was also briefly known as Pleistarcheia, after Pleistarchos, the son of Antipater and brother of Cassander, who ruled Caria for several years following the battle of Ipsos in 301 BC.

Herakleia is thought to have been Christianised early, as an early bishopric is attested. No longer a residential see, it remains a titular see of the Roman Catholic Church.

== Archaeology ==
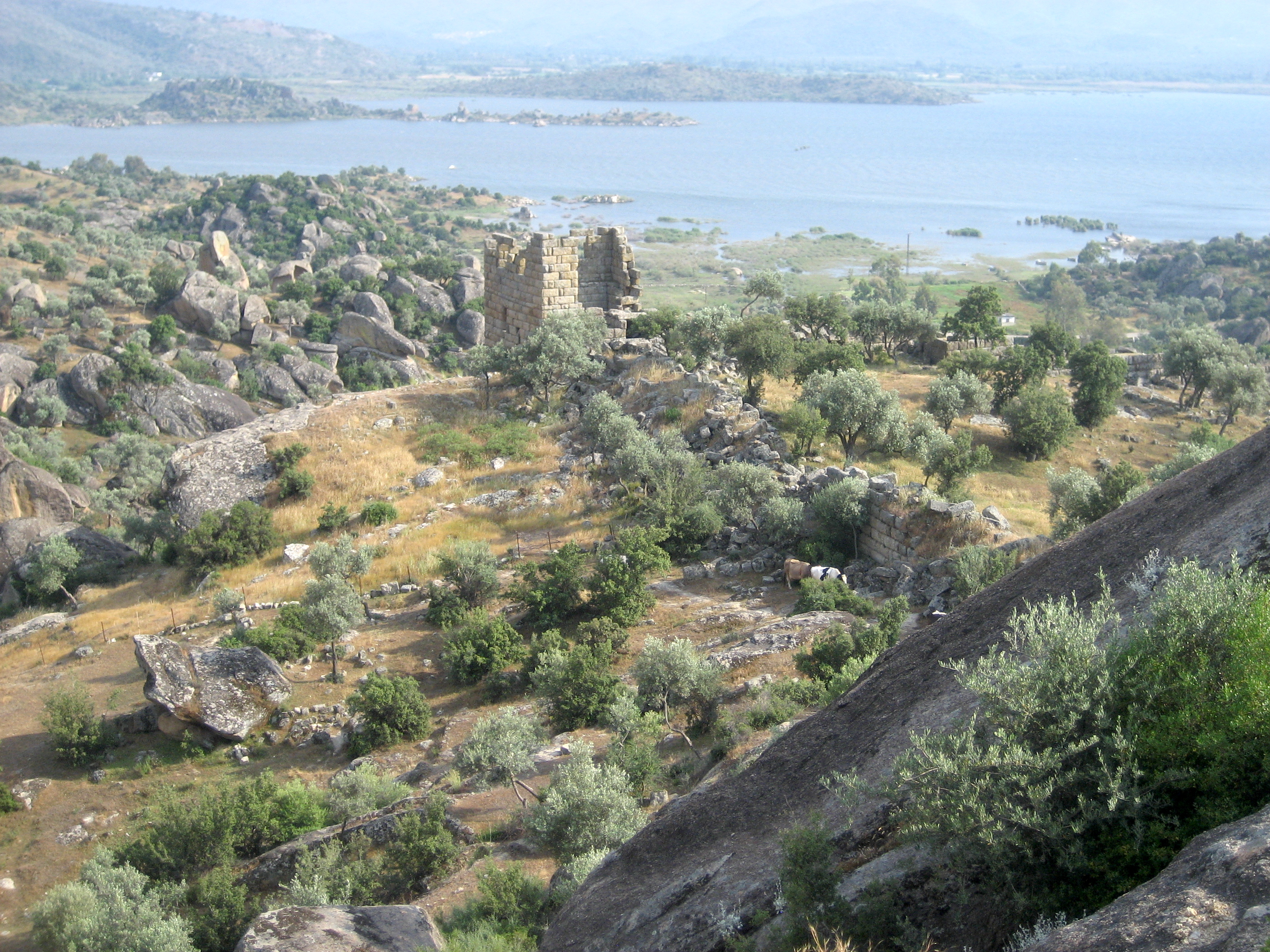
City walls

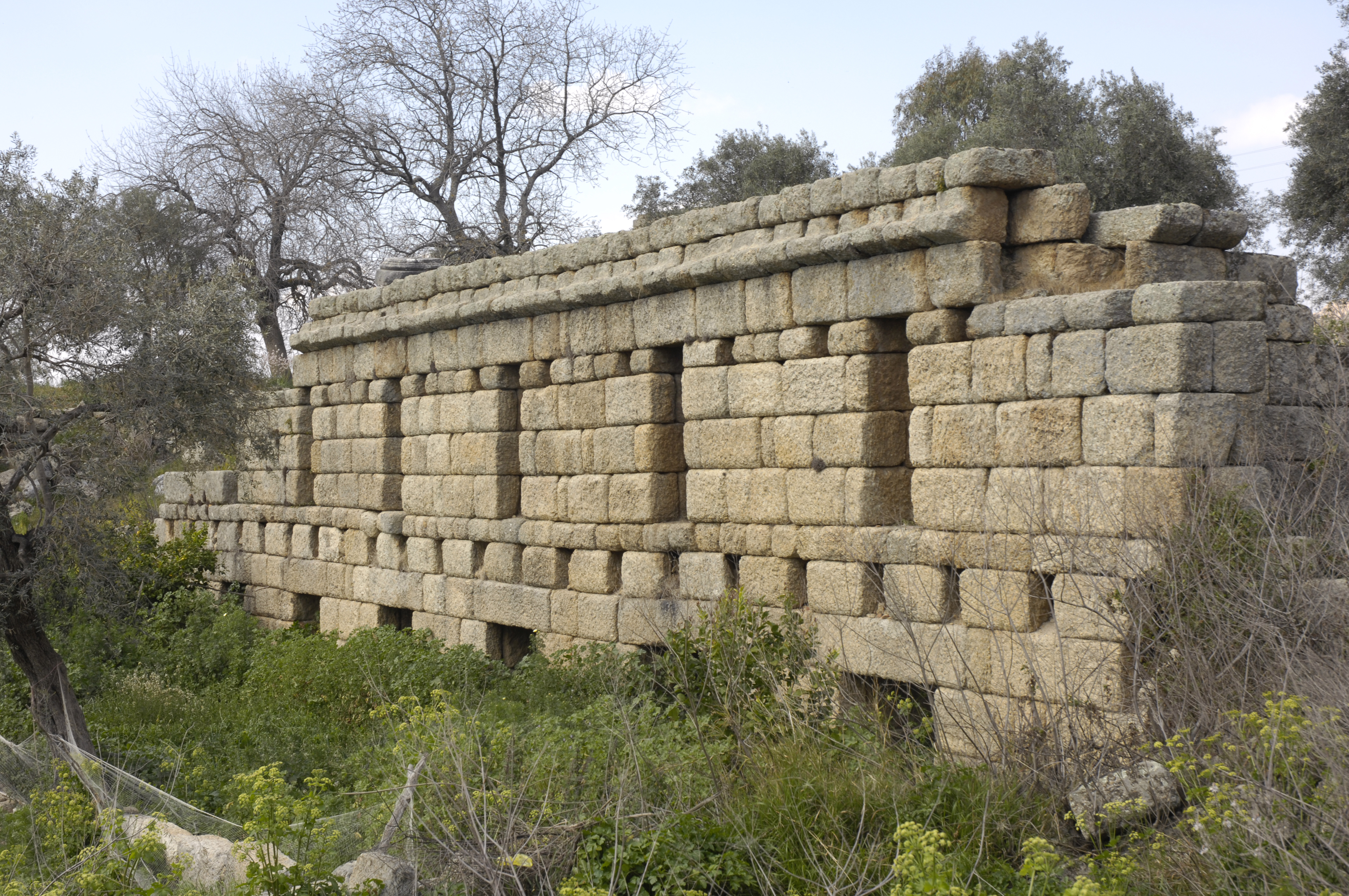
Agora, south building

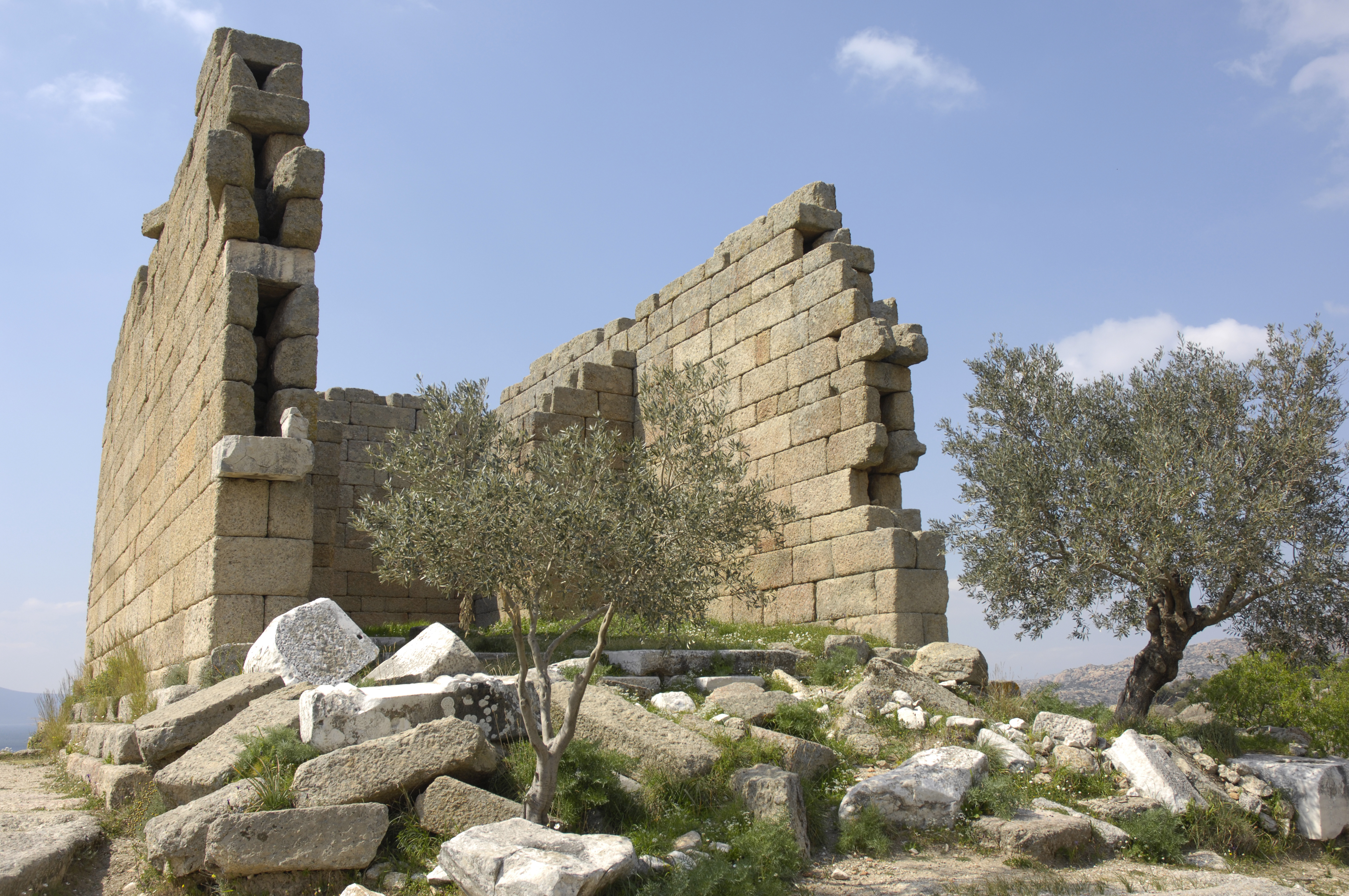
Temple of Athena

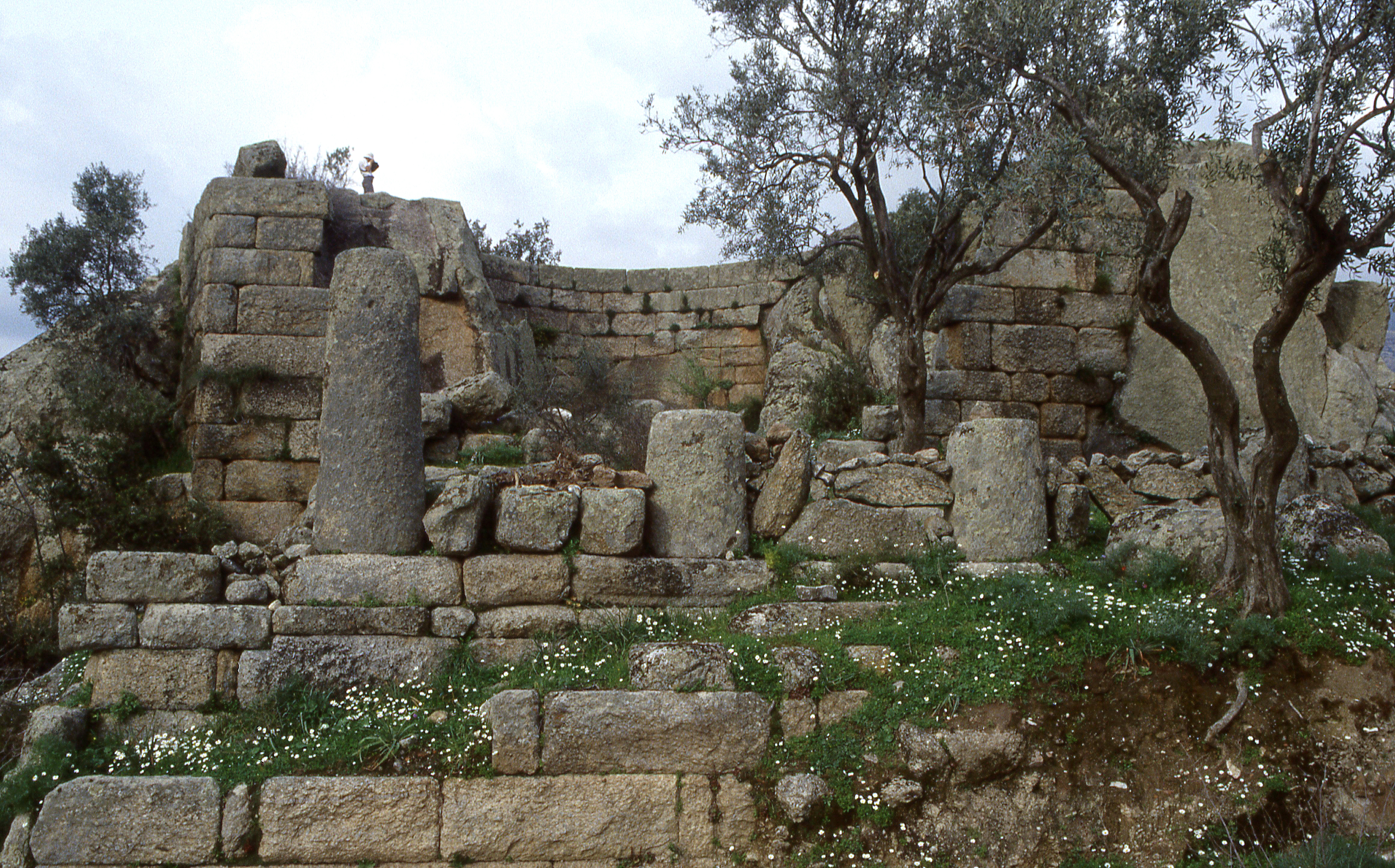
"Sanctuary of Endymion"

The Hellenistic city was built on a Hippodamian grid plan, with streets aligned to the points of the compass. Near the center of the city was the agora, an open square 60 m × 130 m, built on a terrace supported on the south side by a well-preserved building with two levels of shops, the upper opening onto the agora itself, the lower entered from the area below. At the northeast corner of the agora is a bouleuterion, similar in plan to the bouleuterion at Priene.

On a rocky eminence immediately west of the agora stands the temple of Athena, one of the few structures in the city not aligned with the grid. The temple, for which a date in the early 3rd century BC has been suggested, measures 9 m × 17 m, and has a simple plan consisting of a cella, a deep pronaos (nearly as deep as the cella), and two Doric columns in antis on the front. The facade was marble, but the rest of the building was constructed of the same local gneiss that was used for most of the city's buildings and its fortifications. The walls of the cella still stand to a height of over 7 m.

Near the southern end of the city is an unusual structure built into a rocky outcrop, facing southwest and not aligned with the urban grid. It consists of a horseshoe-shaped chamber, 14 m across, its walls partly built of masonry, partly incorporating the existing bedrock, closed off by a cross wall with a central door, in front of which was a facade consisting of a square pier at each corner and five or six columns in between. It has been suggested that this was a shrine to Endymion, the shepherd or hunter loved by the goddess Selene, who in some versions of the myth lived on Mount Latmos and passed his perpetual sleep in a cave on the mountain. According to Pausanias there was an adyton of Endymion somewhere on Latmos; Strabo places Endymion's tomb a short distance away, across a small river.

Among the other buildings whose remains have been identified are three other temples, a theater, a nymphaeum, and a Roman bath. On the slopes of the peninsula at the southern end of the city (now occupied by a Byzantine fort) many rock-cut tombs are visible, some of them underwater because of the rise in the level of the lake. In the Hellenistic period the old city of Latmos, east of Herakleia, also served as a necropolis; some burials there were made in chamber tombs with marble architectural decoration.

The city wall of Herakleia is among the best preserved Hellenistic fortifications in the Greek and Roman world. Although the construction of the wall has sometimes been attributed to king Maussollos of Caria in the mid-4th century BC, most scholars favor a date in the late 4th or early 3rd century BC and associate the wall with Asander, Lysimachos, Pleistarchos, or Demetrios Poliorketes. The original circuit had a total length of 6.5 km, punctuated at intervals by gates and by 65 towers, many of which survive to nearly their original height, preserving doors, windows, stairs, and other architectural features. The circuit was later reduced to 4.5 km by a diateichisma or cross wall that eliminated the highest elevations to the northeast.
