= Lake Bafa =

Lake situated in southwestern Turkey

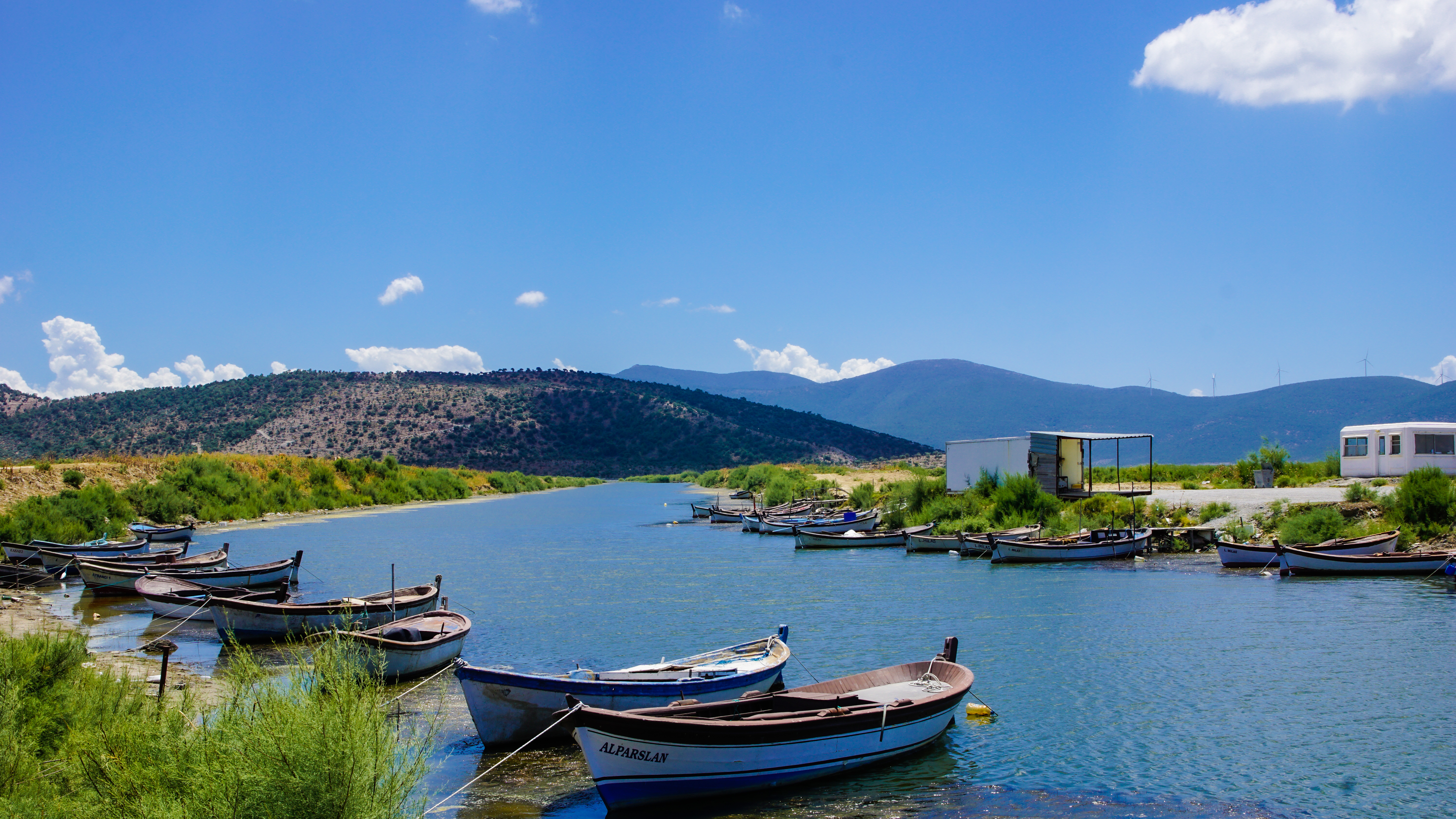

- Location within Turkey
- Location: southwest Turkey
- Coordinates: 37°30′N 27°25′E
- Basin countries: Turkey

Lake Bafa (Turkish: Bafa Gölü) also known as Lake Çamiçi (Turkish: Çamiçi Gölü) and in earlier times the Vafi Sea (Turkish: Vafi Denizi) is a lake situated in southwestern Turkey, part of it within the boundaries of Milas district of Muğla Province and the northern part within Aydın Province's Söke district. The lake used to be a gulf of the Aegean Sea until the Classical period, when the sea passage was gradually closed by the alluvial mass brought by Büyük Menderes River (historically the Maeander or Meander River). The gulf, and later the lake, was named Latmus in antiquity.

The southern shore of the lake is traced by the highway connecting İzmir-Kuşadası-Söke to towns such as Milas and Bodrum that are situated in the south. The northern shore of the lake, where steep slopes are covered by wild or semi-domesticated olive trees, is virtually untouched to this day.

The lake area was officially declared as a nature reserve named Lake Bafa Nature Park.

== History ==
Location of lake Bafa at Maeander River's mouth and the steps of its creation during Antiquity.

At the innermost north-east tip of the lake is the village of Kapıkırı, as well as the ruins of Heraclea by Latmus (sometimes called Heraclea in Ionia), to distinguish from other ancient Greek sites named Heraclea. The mountain chain of Beşparmak (Dağları) -also named (Latmus) in antiquity- rises on the back, sheltering the non-restored ruins of a dozen monasteries dating from the Byzantine era on its slopes. Yet another monastery is situated on an islet on the lake just across the village. The village of Kapıkırı has recently developed important facilities catering to visiting tourists, although agriculture and fishing still occupies an important part in its economy.

According to the legend, it was here that the goddess Selene fell in love with the shepherd Endymion and she asked Zeus to keep the young shepherd in perpetual sleep and bore up to fifty children from her nightly encounters with the sleeping young man.

== Lake Bafa Nature Park ==
Lake Bafa and its surrounding is one of the important bird sanctuaries in Turkey. The west coast overlooking the Balat Plain of Lake Bafa is a shallow area where migratory birds stay and breed in autumn and spring. Also rich in fish and crayfish, a good quantity was sent to fishery cooperatives operating nearby.

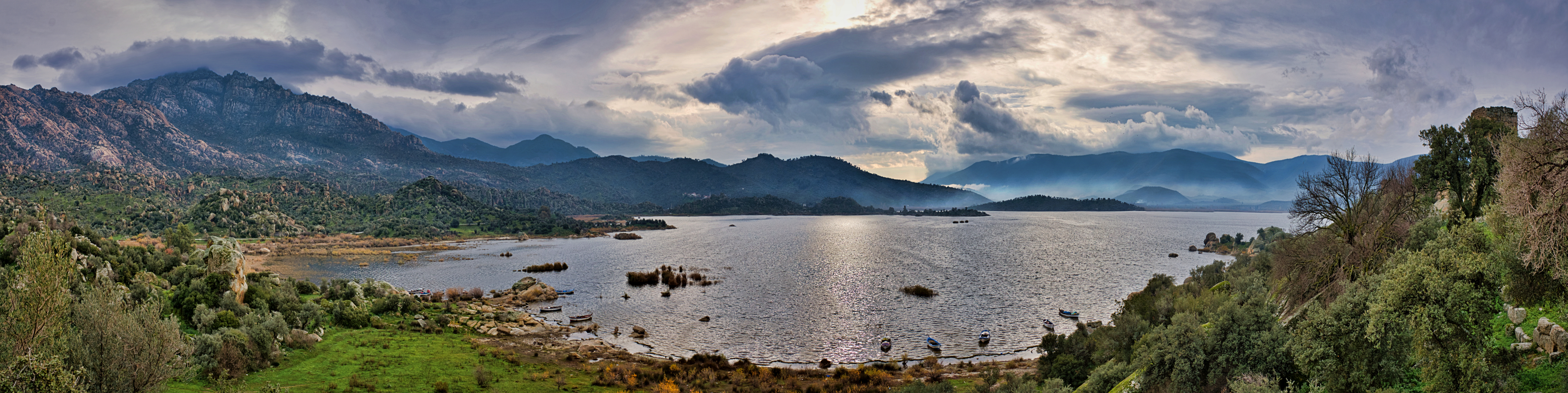
A panoramic view of Lake Bafa at The Latmos Mountains.

Lake Bafa was declared a nature reserve in 1994 as Lake Bafa Nature Park (Turkish: Bafa Gölü Tabiat Parkı). On the other hand, the changing chemical content and decreasing oxygen amount with the reduction and pollution of the river waters pouring into the lake caused the death of hundreds of thousands of fish and the ecosystem drifting into an irreversible junction. Apart from this, the disconnecting of the Büyük Menderes river from the lake, and the fact that the waste of olive oil factories built around the lake continued to be poured into the lake without treatment, has distorted the natural habitat.

== Gallery ==
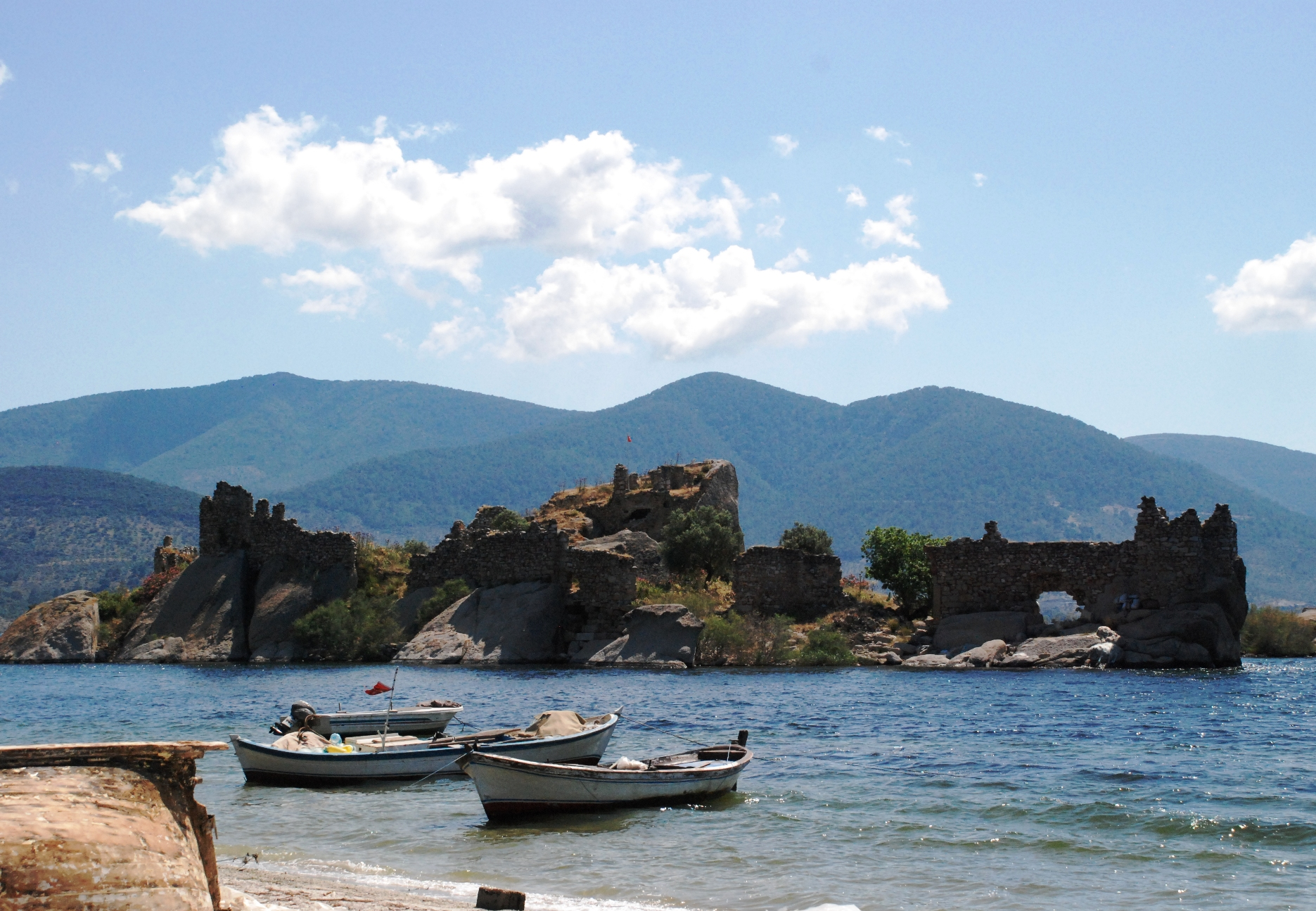

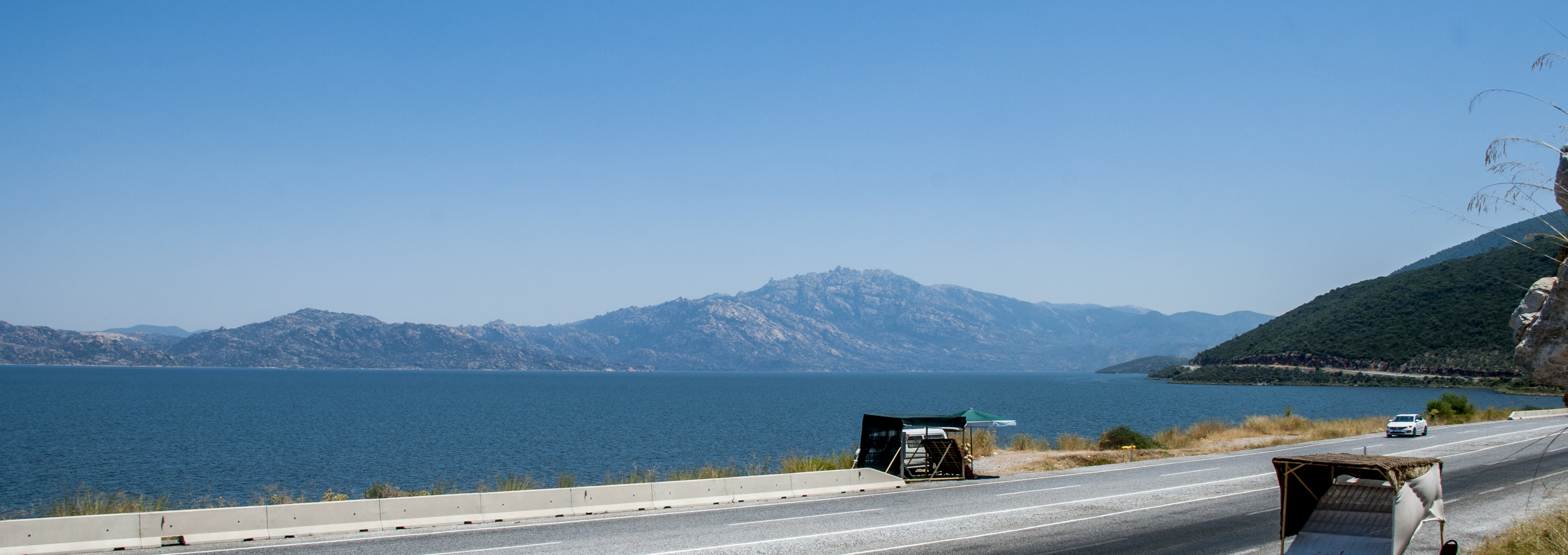

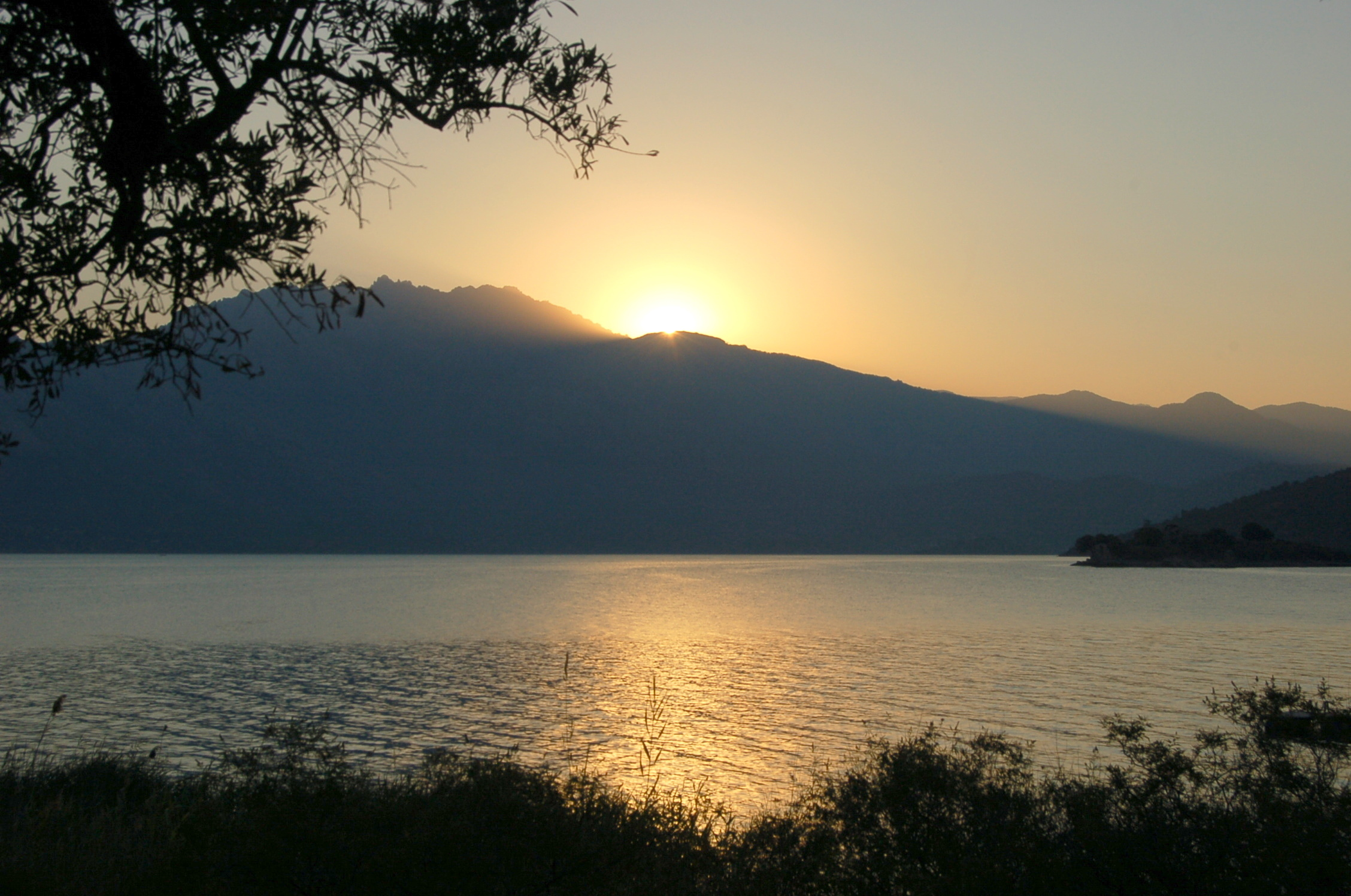

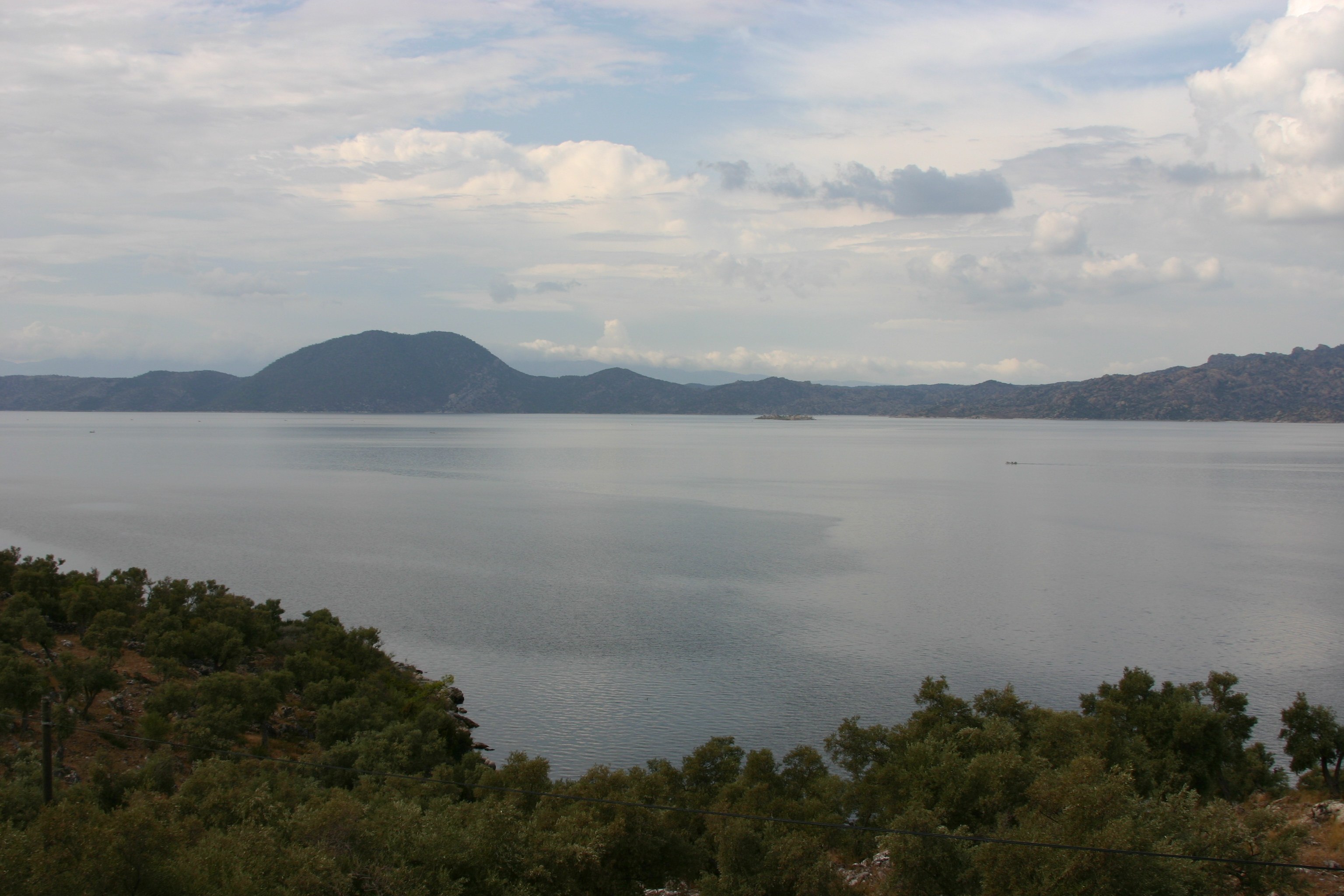

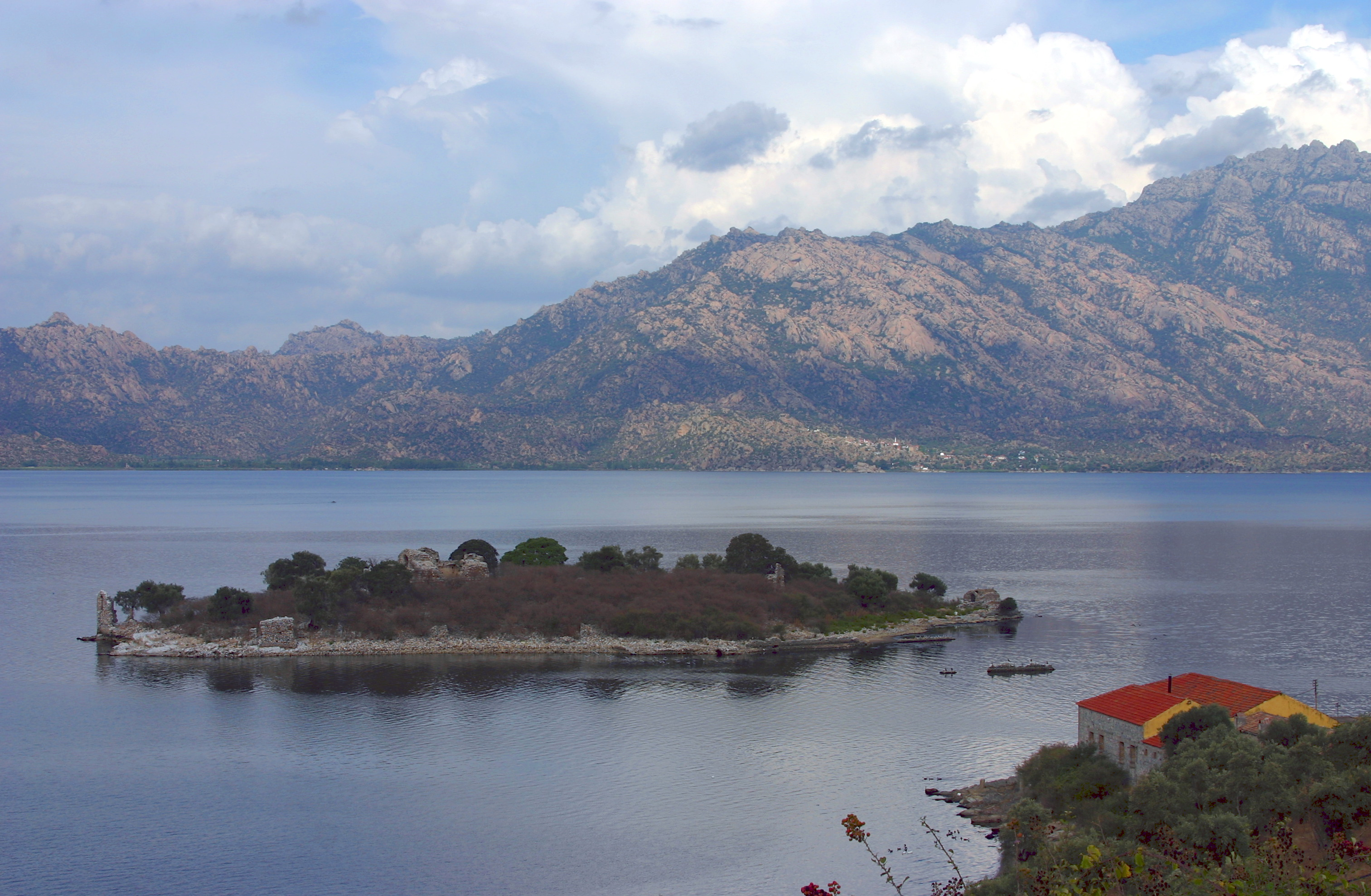

== See also ==
- Milas
- Heraclea (disambiguation)
