= Cycladic Massif =

The Cycladic Massif is a Miocene high-pressure orogenic segment located in the Aegean Sea underlying the Cyclades. Initially, the Massif was a single island which began to break apart due to the tectonic activity of the subduction of the African Plate under the Eurasian Plate during the late Miocene Epoch.
