= Sinuri =

Ancient religious site in Turkey

- Σινυρι (Ancient Greek)
- Location within Turkey Location within Turkey Aegean
- 37.2533°N 27.8983°E
- Type: Sanctuary
- Satellite of: Mylasa
- Location: Çamlıbelen, Muğla Province, Turkey
- Region: Caria

Sinuri (Ancient Greek: Σινυρι) was a sanctuary of the god Sinuri in ancient Caria, Anatolia. The ruins of Sinuri are located on the hilltop now called Tarla Tepe, close to the modern village of Çamlıbelen, Milas, Muğla Province, Turkey. It was an active religious centre for over a thousand years, from the Archaic period to late antiquity. The community at Sinuri erected a large number of inscriptions from the 4th to the 1st centuries BCE, and it is one of the most important known find-sites for inscriptions in the Carian language. Extensive excavations halted in 1937 and organised archaeological activity only resumed in 2022.

== History ==
Sinuri was situated in a mountain pass in central Caria. Although two Neolithic stone axes show the age of the site, the archaeological evidence only proves that Sinuri experienced sporadic inhabitation as a natural refuge from the Geometric period onwards. A temenos wall from the 7th century BCE demonstrates that Sinuri had become was a developed religious space. Regular religious activity would have been conducted in the open, perhaps in a sacred grove, as excavations have found no evidence of Archaic buildings within the outer temenos walls. Sacred groves were common in Archaic Caria, such as at Labraunda, Lagina, and Kasossos.

The sanctuary of Sinuri was governed by a 'clan' or 'fraternity' called syngeneia (Ancient Greek: συγγένεια). Most members of the syngeneia lived in the nearby village of Hierakome. The epigraphic evidence shows that the governing syngeneia was initially that of Pelekos, which was renamed for unknown reasons to the syngeneia of Ponmoonous or Pormounous in the mid-4th century BCE. Pelekos may have been the historical or mythical founder of the all-male priesthood of Sinuri, as his name begins a list of historical priests inscribed in the 2nd century BCE.

=== Hecatomnid period ===
Alongside Labraunda and Amyzon, Sinuri was one of three rural highland sanctuaries which benefited from extensive patronage by the Hecatomnids who ruled Caria as satraps in the 4th century BCE. The sanctuary was enlarged and rebuilt on terraces, obscuring the previous Archaic entrance, and a new temenos wall was built. An inscription records the dedication of a new altar by Hecatomnus (r.392–377 BCE) himself. Inscribed decrees in both Carian and Greek show that Idrieus and Ada (r.315–344 BCE) intervened in the governance of the sanctuary.

=== Hellenistic period ===
Sinuri remained an important religious centre after the Macedonian conquest of Asia Minor. In the 290s BCE, Sinuri was governed by the Macedonian dynast Pleistarchus as part of his territory in northern Caria alongside Heraclea at Latmus and Hyllarima. An inscribed decree of Pleistarchus' admits an outsider into the governing syngeneia of Pormounos. A break in the epigraphic record of Sinuri in the early 3rd century BCE suggests that the site was contested between Pleistarchus and Ptolemaic southern Caria in this time. Alongside Mylasa, it was most likely governed by Ptolemy II from the start of his reign in 282 BCE.

Sinrui lay on the frontier between the major poleis of Mylasa and Stratonicea from the time of the latter's foundation by the Seleucids in the 260s BCE. Like nearby Kasossos, it was absorbed into the growing polis of Mylasa in the Hellenistic period. Sinuri remained a prominent sanctuary but the governing synegeneia of Pormoonous became a constituent part of Mylasa. This process occurred by the time Olympichos, alternately a client of Seleucus II and Philip V, ruled Caria from Alinda in the late 3rd century BCE. Accordingly, the majority of inscriptions from Sinuri record their eponymous magistrate as being the stephanephoros of Mylasa. From the 1st century BCE, priests of Sinuri could belong to other Mylasan syngeneiai than that of Pormoonous. Priests served for life; while the priesthood may have been hereditary in earlier years, it could probably be bought and sold by the late 1st century BCE.

Caria was contested in the 3rd century between Antigonid, Seleucid, Ptolemaic, Rhodian and Pergamene interests. A fragmentary inscribed letter from Antiochus III to the community at Sinuri shows that his military campaign of 203 BCE reached Sinuri, although Sinuri received nominal independence from the conquering governor Zeuxis as part of Mylasa. Macedonian interests in Caria were ended with the Treaty of Apamea in 188 BCE, confirming Rhodian rule with Roman support. Mylasa recovered its free city status, with tax exemptions, under the Rhodians as previously under the Seleucids; this seemingly encouraged economic activity at the sacred lands of Sinuri.

=== Roman period ===
Sinuri remained an important religious centre, still dependent on Mylasa, after being incorporated into Roman Asia. The epigraphic record at Sinuri stops abruptly in the second half of the 1st century BCE. The sanctuary may have been destroyed by Quintus Labienus when he sacked Mylasa in 40 BCE.

A small Byzantine basilica from the 5th or 6th centuries CE shows that religious activity continued at Sinuri, albeit on a much smaller scale, even after Christianisation.

== The God Sinuri ==
Caria was home to many mountainous sanctuaries for indigenous gods, such as Labraunda, Hyllarima, and Panamara. By the Archaic or Classical periods, when literary and epigraphic evidence first survives from those sanctuaries, their gods had been assimilated with Zeus by syncretism: Zeus Labraundos, Zeus Hyllos, and Zeus Panamaros respectively. For unknown reasons, the god Sinuri was not subject to the same process of syncretism. The sanctuary therefore shares its name with its principal deity.

The divine name Sinuri is of unknown origin. Axel W. Persson initially related it to the Mesopotamian moon-god Sin. Other Mesopotamian connections in Caria are known; the old name of Aphrodisias was Ninoe, which Stephanus of Byzantium calls a variant of Niniveh in Assyria. This proposal has not been universally accepted, though, and an Anatolian origin for the god is also possible; the second half of the name 'Sinuri' may relate to the Hittite word uri, meaning 'great'.

Other than that he was male, little is known about the god Sinuri. Altars bearing a double-axe (labrys) associate this common Carian religious symbol with Sinuri. On this basis, Dolores Hegyi has suggested that Sinuri may have been the indigenous name for Zeus Karios, which Herodotus identified as the most popular god in Caria in his time. As well as at Sinuri, the god was also worshipped in the territory of Hyllarima, according to a priesthood sale of the 2nd century BCE. A bull-sacrifice festival called the Bouthysia was held every year in the Macedonian month of Loios, approximately July in the Gregorian calendar.

The god was worshipped at Sinuri at least until the 1st century BCE. As with other religious centres in Caria, Sinuri experienced Christianisation in late antiquity, by which time worship of Sinuri presumably ceased.

== Epigraphy ==
It was subject to extensive excavations in the 1930s by a French archaeological team under the direction of Pierre Devambez. Inscriptions discovered during the French excavations were published by Louis Robert in 1945. The majority of known inscriptions from Sinuri use the Greek language and date from the 4th to the 1st centuries BCE. Many inscriptions were reused in Byzantine buildings at Sinuri and can still be found at the site.

=== Carian Inscriptions ===
Two inscriptions in the Carian language are known from Sinuri. These use a distinctive local variant of the Carian alphabet, most closely related to that of Kildara. Although Louis Robert claimed to have found (but not published) a third Carian inscription from Sinuri, Wolfgang Blümel has since confirmed that this was originally a Greek text which had been erased in antiquity. Nonetheless, the length and content of the known inscriptions make Sinuri one of the most remarkable find-sites of Carian language material in Anatolia.

The fragmentary inscription known as C.Si 2 records part of two decrees in both Greek and Carian issued by the Hecatomnid satraps and sibling-spouses Idrieus and Ada. The dynasts' names are recorded as 'Idrieus (son) of Hecatomnus and Ada (daughter) of Hecatomnus', [id]ryin k̂tmñoś sb ada k̂tmñoś ([𐤧𐊢]𐋈𐤧𐊵 𐊴𐊭𐊪𐊳𐊫𐊸 𐊰𐊩 𐊠𐊢𐊠 𐊴𐊭𐊪𐊳𐊫𐊸). Interpretation of the Carian-language decrees is disputed. It apparently refers to Ponmoounnean (i.e. a member of the governing syngeneia of Ponmoonnous/Pormounous). The Carian word pñmnn-śñ (𐊷𐊳𐊪𐊵𐊵𐊸𐊳) is an accusativus genitivi, forming an accusative singular in -ñ on an original possessive adjective in -ś. The decree may have conveyed the privilege of freedom of taxation (ateleia) to an individual. Regardless of the precise content, this inscription is unique in showing that the Hecatomnids issued laws in Carian as well as in Greek.

The other Carian inscription from Sinuri, known as C.Si 1, is much shorter and may be funerary. Because no other Carian inscriptions are known from the site, and Greek inscriptions are so much more numerous, it is likely that Greek became the dominant language of the community at Sinuri by the end of the 4th century BCE. An inscribed list of priests from the 2nd century BCE records Greek names in the two most recent columns and indigenous, Carian names only in the first column, suggesting that naming practices had changed with the spoken language in the early Hellenistic period.

=== Greek Inscriptions ===
A large proportion of surviving Greek-language inscriptions concern sacred lands owned by the god Sinuri and his priesthood. Many of these are lease documents. Land sold to the god was then permanently leased back to the original owner and his descendants, who paid rent in cash and olive oil to the sanctuary. This arrangement was common in central Caria in the Hellenistic period and hundreds of similar documents survive from nearby Mylasa, Olymos, and Euromos. Consequently, not all the land owned by Sinuri was contiguous, and this dispersal of territory may have facilitated the sanctuary's integration into Mylasa.
