= Koranza =

Town in ancient Caria

- Κώρανζα (Ancient Greek)
- Koarrenda, Koarenda Koarenza, Koaranza, and Koraza
- Location within Turkey Location within Turkey Aegean
- 37°22′N 28°02′E
- Type: Town
- Satellite of: Stratonicea (Caria)
- Location: Turgut, Muğla Province, Turkey
- Region: Caria

Koranza (Ancient Greek: Κώρανζα) was a town of central Caria. It was a polis (city-state) and controlled the sanctuary of Apollo and Artemis at Lagina before the foundation of Stratonicea. Its original name was Koarrenda (Κοάρρενδα) or similar.

== Name ==
The name of Koranza has many different spellings in antiquity: Koarrenda, Koarenda, Koarenza, Koaranza, Koranza, and Koraza were all used. Confusion arose from the use of Greek to spell a Carian name. The native Carian spelling is not known. The name may genuinely have undergone sound changes in the local dialect over the 4th and 3rd centuries BCE, with the first syllable shifting and the final /-nd-/ becoming /-(d)z-/ (spelled with a Greek zeta). As a result, its earliest known name was Koarrenda (Κοάρρενδα) and its latest Koraza (Κωραζα).

The original form of the name may have had the animative suffix -and-/-end- seen in many other Anatolian place names, such as Miletus (originally Millawanda), which individualised stems for use as a place name. The stem of Koar-enda may then have been related to Luwian ku(a)ri- or Hittite kuera-, both meaning 'field'. Koranza was probably named for the specific field it was situated in, close to Lagina (modern Turgut). A similar name appears in Hittite inscriptions of the 2nd millennium BCE: Kuranda.

== History ==
Koranza was originally known as Koarrenda, governed and inhabited by the community of the Koarrendians (Κοαρρενδεις). It was presumably located close to Lagina; inscribed laws of the community of the Koarrendians were reused in the foundations of the magnificent temple of Hekate at Lagina, which was built in the 2nd or 1st centuries BCE. The Koarrendians presumably controlled this important sanctuary in central Caria before the foundation of Stratonicea in the mid-3rd century BCE.

The earliest inscriptions from Koranza describe it as a polis: a city-state according to Greek tradition. No Carian inscriptions from Koranza are known.

Koranza sent envoys on behalf of its polis community (i.e. Koarrenzians, Κοαρρενζεις) to witness what was probably a land transaction in southern Caria, as documented by a fragmentary mid-4th century BCE inscription from Sekköy, between ancient Mylasa and Ceramus. Ancient Koranza was clearly engaged in regional diplomacy in the time of Hecatomnid rule. Ambassadors from many other Carian communities were also present, including Hydai, Caunus, Alabanda, Latmus, Pladasa, Ceramus, Ouranus, and Koliurga.

One of Koranza's earliest inscriptions dates itself to the reigns of Philip III of Macedon and his satrap Asander. Koranza is therefore one of many Carian communities whose epigraphic evidence points to greater engagement in the political interactions of the Hellenistic world under Asander, alongside Amyzon, Heraclea at Latmus, and elsewhere. This inscription records how Asander confirmed a previous privilege of tax exemption (ateleia) conferred by Mausolus, the earlier Hecatomnid satrap.

An inscription from Labraunda describes Eupolemus using Koranza as a base for his army, presumably while fighting Antigonus I Monophthalmus in the mid-310s BCE. It was still an important town in the 290s BCE, when the reign of Pleistarchus dates a proxeny inscription issued by Hyllarima for a man from Koranza.

Koranza was eclipsed by the Seleukid foundation of Stratonicea to its southeast in the 260s BCE. This Macedonian colony which drew on Koranza and other Carian communities nearby to supplement its population. Koranza lost control of the sanctuary at Lagina to Stratonicea, and quickly became a subdivision (deme) within the territory of the larger city.

== Religion ==
The religious life of Koranza was dominated by Lagina. Before the temple of Hekate at Lagina was built by the Stratoniceans in the Hellenistic period, the principal gods at Lagina were the divine pair Apollo and Artemis, whose worship must have been central to the civic life of the Koarrendians. An inscription from c. 350 BCE records the dedication of woodland to Artemis and Apollo by a married couple from Koranza.

Smaller cults were also important. A unique inscription from the foundations of the temple of Hekate at Lagina describe regulations for a private family cult at Koranza. Worship was for the 'fates' or 'daimons' (ἀγαθοί δαίμονες) of two locals called Leros and Kosinas. Uniquely, Leros was not dead when his cult was set up, because the inscription specified that he (and his descendants thereafter) could have the thigh of the sacrificial ram to eat every year. This was therefore not ancestor-worship, at least initially. The inscription has regulations for the succession of the priesthood within the family over several generations, so presumably looked ahead beyond the death of Leros. As well as regular animal sacrifice, the inscription notes that this family cult would receive an altar.
