= Idrias =

Town of ancient Caria

Idrias (Ancient Greek: Ἰδριάς) was a town of ancient Caria. It has been suggested that Idrias could be identified with the city that the Hittite texts of the Bronze Age call Atriya. Herodotus cites the territory of Idrias, which he names Idriade where rose the Marsyas River (Çine Çay), which is a tributary of the Maeander River. It was a member of the Delian League since it appears in a tribute decree of Athens dated to 425/4 BCE. Subsequently, in the opinion of Mehmet Çetin Şahin, Idrias was called Hiera Kome (meaning 'sacred village'). However, Stephanus of Byzantium quotes Apollonius of Aphrodisias who identifies Idrias with Chrysaorium. Pausanias says that Stratonicea was previously called Chrysaorium. Strabo speaks of the cult of Zeus Chrysaoreus near Stratonicea and that this city was head of the Chrysaorian League. It may also be the Chrysaoris. It is probable that Idrias was one of the towns that joined in synoecism to found Stratonicea and remained one of its districts. William Martin Leake held that Stratonicea was built on the site of the town.
