= Chrysaorium =

City in ancient Caria, Anatolia

Chrysaorium was a city in ancient Caria, Anatolia, between Euromus (also Eunomus) and Stratonicea. In Seleucid times, Chrysaorium was the seat of the Chrysaorian League. The League's assembly met here, in a temple of Zeus Chrysaorius. Stephanus of Byzantium quotes Apollonius of Aphrodisias who identifies Chrysaorium with Idrias. Pausanias says that Stratonicea was previously called Chrysaorium. Strabo speaks of the cult of Zeus Chrysaoreus near Stratonicea and that this city was head of the Chrysaorian League. It may also be associated with the ancient town of Chrysaoris.
