= Chrysaor (disambiguation) =

Chrysaor was the brother of Pegasus in Greek mythology.

Chrysaor may also refer to:

- Chrysaor (sword), weapon of Sir Artegall in Edmund Spenser's poem The Faerie Queene
- Chrysaor Krishna, one of Poseidon's Mariners in the manga Saint Seiya
- Chrysaor, junior synonym of Empyreuma, genus of tiger moths in the family Erebidae
- Chrysaor, hydrocarbon company and holder of the Everest gasfield UK exploration rights
- Chrysaor, gasfield in the Gorgon gas project, Western Australia

== Similar spellings ==
- Chrysaora (common name sea nettle), a genus of jellyfish in the family Pelagiidae
- Chrysaoros, Demeter's epithet as "Lady of the Golden Blade", a reference to golden blades of wheat
- Ancient Greek towns in Caria, now western Anatolia, Turkey:
  - Chrysaoris
  - Chrysaorium
