= Şaban Ağa Mosque =

Mosque in Muğla, Turkey

- Şaban Ağa Camii
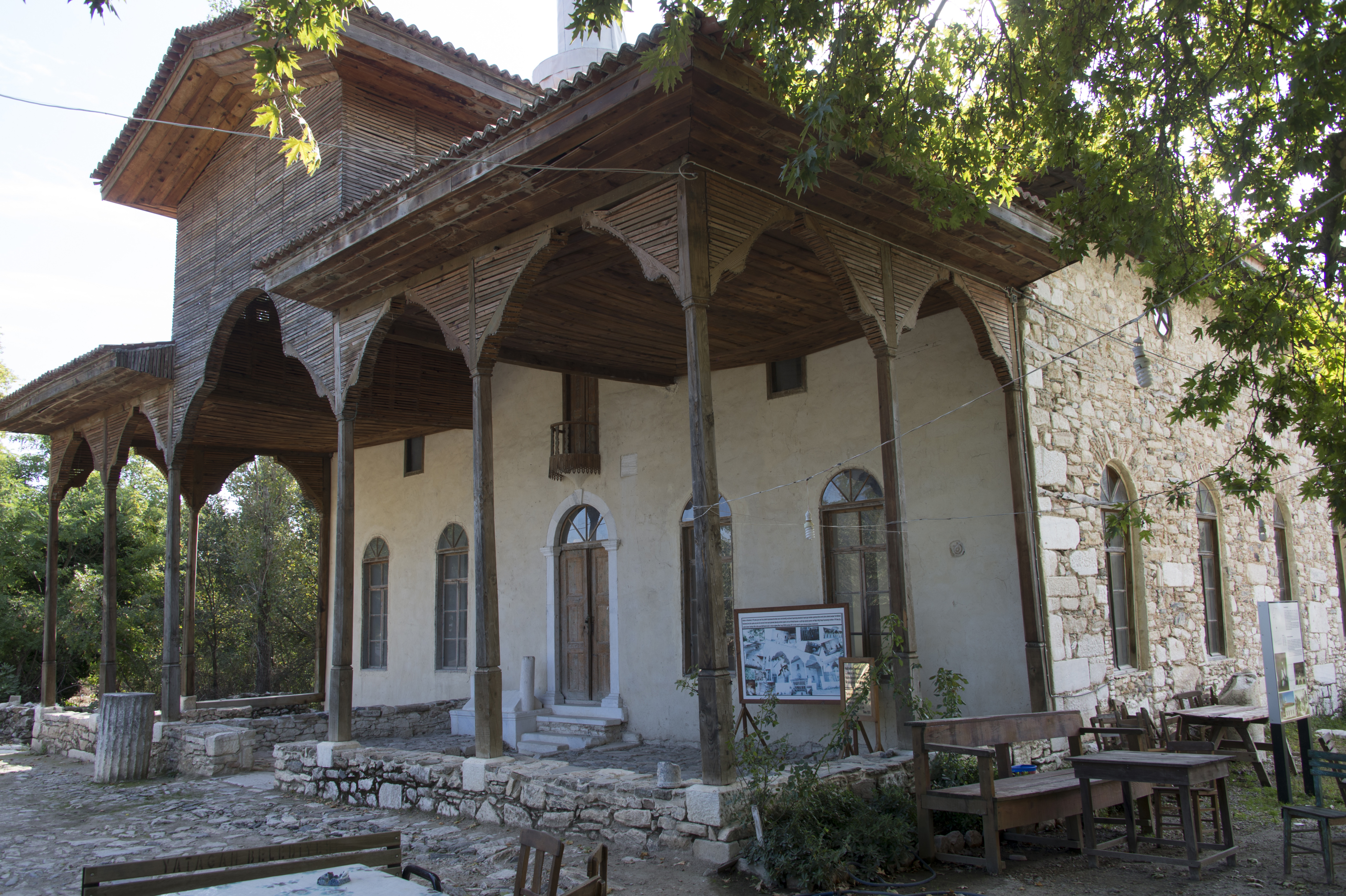

- Location within Turkey

Religion
- Affiliation: Islam

Location
- State: Muğla
- Country: Turkey
- Interactive map of Şaban Ağa Mosque
- Coordinates: 37°18′48″N 28°03′48″E

Architecture
- Type: mosque

Specifications
- Length: 14.5 m
- Width: 14.5 m

Şaban Ağa Mosque (Turkish: Şaban Ağa Camii) is a historical mosque in Muğla Province, Turkey.

The mosque is situated in the ancient site of Stratonicea in Yatağan ilçe (district) of Muğla Province. Although an ancient site, Stratonicea continued as a settlement during the Turkish era. There is a Seljukid hamam (bath) and an Ottoman mosque. Suleiman I of the Ottoman Empire probably visited the mosque in 1522 during his campaign to Rhodes. Evliya Çelebi, the Ottoman traveler in the 17th century also saw the mosque and named it Tabakhane Mosque. Nevertheless, in 1876 it went under wholescale restoration. The commissioner of the restoration was a certain Şaban Ağa and thus the restored mosque is named after him.

The mosque is a square-plan mosque each side being 14.5 metres (48 ft). Its nartex to the north is supported by 8 wooden columns. There are 16 windows in the main hall. In 2018 the mosque is restored by the governorship of Muğla.
