= Bozarmut =

- Neighbourhood
- Location in Turkey Bozarmut (Turkey Aegean)
- Coordinates: 37°19′N 28°10′E
- Country: Turkey
- Province: Muğla
- District: Yatağan
- Elevation: 390 m (1,280 ft)
- Population (2022): 2,237
- Time zone: UTC+3 (TRT)
- Postal code: 48500
- Area code: 0252

Bozarmut is a neighbourhood of the municipality and district of Yatağan, Muğla Province, Turkey. Its population is 2,237 (2022). Before the 2013 reorganisation, it was a town (belde). It is situated on the Turkish state highway D.550 which connects Muğla to north Anatolia. The distance to Yatağan is 6 kilometres (3.7 mi) and to Muğla is 22 kilometres (14 mi).

Bozarmut was one of the six towns of Stratonicea in classical antiquity. The capital of Stratonicea was Eskihisar, a village about 10 kilometres (6.2 mi) west of Bozarmut. In 1998 Bozarmut was declared a seat of township.
