= Lagina =

Sanctuary of Hecate in ancient Caria

- Λάγινα (Ancient Greek)
- Location within Turkey Location within Turkey Aegean
- 37.378333°N 28.039167°E
- Periods: Hellenistic, Roman
- Satellite of: Stratonicea (Caria)
- Location: Turgut, Muğla Province, Turkey
- Region: Caria

Lagina (Ancient Greek: τὰ Λάγινα) or Laginia (Λαγινία) was a town and religious centre in ancient Caria. It contained an important monumental temple of Hecate, at which great festivals were celebrated every year. For most of antiquity, it was a part of the territory of Stratonicea.

Its site is located near Turgut, Anatolia, in southwestern Turkey.

== History ==
Recent studies have revealed the site to have been inhabited and/or employed in an uninterrupted manner during a time span stretching back to the Bronze Age.

Little is known about the early history of Lagina as a town and religious sanctuary, although it existed as early as the 4th century BCE. At that time, Lagina was a deme of nearby Koranza. Unlike the sanctuaries at Sinuri or Labraunda, Lagina does not appear to have been favoured by the Hecatomnids.

Lagina became one of the major rural cult centres of the polis of Stratonicea. Stratonicea was a large Seleucid colony in Caria, settled by Macedonians and local Carians, in the mid-3rd century BCE. Every year, Stratoniceans would go on pilgrimage to the temple of Hecate at Lagina and of Zeus at Panamara. When Tacitus spoke of the worship of Trivia among the Stratoniceans, he evidently meant Hecate. The goddess Hecate was so important to Stratonicea that her likeness appeared on coins of the independent city after 167/166 BCE.

Seleucid kings conducted a considerable construction effort in the sacred ground of Lagina and transformed it into a foremost religious center of its time. Lagina and Stratonicea were connected to each other by a 'sacred path' 11 kilometers long, along which pilgrims could process.

The close association between Lagina and Stratonicea continued after the Seleucids lost control of Caria. In 188 BCE, the Treaty of Apamea gave governance of Caria to Rhodes, an ally of the Roman Republic during the Roman–Seleucid war. An inscription from this time shows that the head priest of Hecate was also appointed local priest of the Rhodian sun-god Helios, by decree of Stratonicea.

Alongside the rest of Caria, Lagina and Stratonicea became part of the Roman province of Asia by the end of the 2nd century BCE. The Roman period saw the most elaborate temple of Hekate build at Lagina. Although it was previously thought that the temple was constructed in the aftermath of the First Mithridatic War (i.e. late 80s BCE), it is now understood to have been built earlier, before the war against Eumenes III Aristonikos in 133 BCE. The temple is considered the last great monument of the so-called 'Ionian Renaissance', which began in Hecatomnid Caria with monuments like the Mausoleum of Halicarnassus.

Monumental construction continued under the Roman Empire. The emperor Augustus himself donated a significant amount to help the site recover from damage after Lagina was attacked by Quintus Labienus, a rebel with Parthian support, in 40 BCE. In particular, a new altar was built.

Lagina continued to thrive until a catastrophic earthquake in 365 BCE. After that date, all stoai fell out of use and the central altar was cracked. A large basilica was subsequently built between the altar and the temple, and used from the 4th to the 6th centuries CE.

Lagina was Christianised at an early date and was the seat of a bishop; no longer a residential see, it remains a titular see of the Roman Catholic Church.

=== Worship of Hecate ===
Lagina was the largest site of a monumental temple to Hecate. The rituals carried out at Lagina were therefore unique. Hecate was a goddess of ancient Greek mythology whose roots were probably Carian and Anatolian. Her general attributes included torches, keys, and dogs, and today she is often associated with witchcraft.

Part of these rituals included a "Key-Carrying" ceremony in which a choir of young girls would walk from Lagina to Stratonicea to declare their devotion to the city. On their return, the gates would be opened by the girl carrying the key (the kleidophoros), and the religious festivities would begin. This ritual not only served as a political reminder that Stratonicea controlled Lagina, but also that Hecate controlled the keys to the underworld.

== Excavations ==
The site of Lagina was often visited by travellers in the eighteenth and nineteenth centuries. The British archaeologist Charles Thomas Newton found over thirty inscriptions and nine decorated frieze blocks at the site in 1856. His publications brought European scholarly attention to Lagina.

Authorised excavations began at Lagina in 1891 under the direction of Osman Hamdi Bey. The archaeological research conducted in Lagina is historically significant in that it was the first authorised excavation to have been done by a Turkish scientific team.

In 1993, excavation and restoration work was resumed under the guidance of the Muğla Museum, by an international team advised by Professor Ahmet Tırpan.

In 2020, the ancient columns of the Hecate temple were re-erected following extensive restoration and excavation at the site. The head of excavation at the temple, Professor Bilal Sögüt, noted that visitors could now see where the columns would have stood 2050 years ago when the temple was a place of worship to the goddess Hecate. The columns were built in the Corinthian order, with 8 columns on the shorter sides of the temple, and 11 on the longer sides. An inscription on the entrance gate indicate that Emperor Augustus financially supported the Sanctuary of Hecate.

=== Friezes ===
The friezes of the Hecate sanctuary are displayed in the Istanbul Archaeology Museums. Four different themes are depicted in these friezes. These are, on the eastern frieze, scenes from the life of Zeus; on the western frieze, a battle between gods and Gigantes; on the southern frieze, a gathering of Carian gods; and on the northern frieze, a battle of Amazons.
