= Olympichos =

Macedonian ruler of ancient Caria

- Native name: Ὀλυμπίχος
- Died: Before c. 201 BCE
- Allegiance: Seleucid Empire (c. 242–227 BCE), Antigonid Dynasty (from c. 227 BCE)
- Rank: Strategos of Caria

Olympichos (Ancient Greek: Ὀλυμπίχος) was a Macedonian dynast who ruled Caria in the late 3rd century BCE (fl. c. 242–201 BCE).

== Personal life ==
His father was also called Olympichos and his wife was called Nicaea. His name suggests that he was a Macedonian. Details of his life and reign are known primarily through epigraphic evidence, meaning that little else can be said about him outside his political activity.

Olympichos died before c. 201 BCE; he is absent from the historical record when the Second Macedonian War broke out, by which time Caria was politically disunited. The eventual result was the Rhodian occupation of Caria by 197 BCE.

== Relationships with kings ==
Olympichos is first attested as a general (στρατηγός) of the Seleucid Empire in 242 BCE, ruling as a deputy of Seleucus II. His predecessors in Caria appear to have been Ptolemaic generals, including a mysterious 'Ptolemy the brother' (Πτολεμ̣αίου τοῦ ἀδελφοῦ).

Olympichos later transferred his allegiance from the Seleucids to the Antigonid dynasty which ruled Macedon. This was a consequence of the expedition to Caria by Antigonus III Doson in 227 BCE. In the later part of his life, Olympichos interacted with subject cities on behalf of Philip V, who succeeded Antigonus III in 221 BCE.

The extent to which Olympichos acted independently of his notional masters is debated. In a letter to the Mylasans, Olympichos vowed to do everything in his own power "and through the king" ([διά τε τοῦ βασιλέως]), in future interactions with the city. He typically defers to higher authorities (Seleucid or Antigonid) in formal communication but may have wielded much independent power in reality, as shown by his ability to change his allegiance from the Seleucids to the Antigonids. Olympichos was the inheritor of a longer tradition of somewhat independent military governance in Caria, like the satraps Mausolus, Asander, and Pleistarchus before him.

== Relationships with the cities ==
Olympichos ruled Caria from Alinda. A century before his time, this fortress in northern Caria was the base of Ada I, adoptive mother of Alexander the Great, after she was deposed as satrap by her brother Pixodaros.

It is not clear how much of Caria Olympichos controlled, nor how many city-states (poleis) maintained privileges such as freedom from taxation while he was dynast. As well as Alinda, he controlled a minor fortress called 'Petra' in the territory of Olymos, which he apologised to the people of Mylasa for retaining. His influence spread as far as Mylasa in central Caria, and encroached on the freedoms of Iasos on the west coast. Olympichos also probably controlled Pedasa and Euromos between Mylasa and Iasos. It is very likely that he governed the sanctuary of Amyzon near Alinda as well as Labraunda. There is no evidence that Olympichos's rule ever extended into southern Caria, which was then controlled by Rhodes.

=== Mylasa, Labraunda, and the Olympichos dossier ===
A large dossier of inscriptions relating to his rule was erected in the ancient sanctuary of Labraunda. The site was previously used as an epigraphic depot by the Hecatomnid dynasty. The Olympichos dossier is contemporaneous with a similar range of Greek inscriptions at Labraunda concerning Karian relations with Cretans. Many of these inscriptions from Labraunda relate to a dispute between the sanctuary and the growing city-state (polis) of Mylasa nearby, which Olympichos was often called to intervene in.

Seleucus II had liberated Mylasa in c. 246 BCE and many of the inscriptions record negotiations for the extent of the city's freedom. Olympichos wrote a letter to the Mylasans in c. 242/1 BCE, telling them that Seleucus had ordered him to uphold the freedom of Mylasa and that he had sworn an oath to that effect. These freedoms prohibited Olympichos from taking territory from Mylasa, installing a garrison in the city, or interfering with its democratic constitution.

A clear point of tension demanding mediation by Olympichos was the Mylasan claim of ownership over the sanctuary at Labraunda, which the priesthood of Zeus Labraundos contested. At this time, the priest of Labraunda was a man named Korris (Κόρρις), who wrote to Seleucus in c. 242/1 BCE to retain the historical independence of Labraunda. Olympichos overruled Korris, subordinating his sanctuary and priesthood to the independent civic government of Mylasa.

In thanks, the people of Mylasa built a bronze statue of Olympichos in the early 230s BCE, alongside another bronze statue representing the citizen body (demos) of the city, which crowned the dynast. A marble altar was built in front of this statue group, at which the Mylasans would sacrifice two bulls every year and then hold a feast in his honour. The statue and altar have both since been lost. An inscription explicitly compares these honours to similar ones previously awarded to Mausolus, who also had an altar in Mylasa at the Hecatomneum.

=== Rhodes ===
Polybius records that Olympichos was one of many minor rulers (δυνάσται) who provided aid to Rhodes after the earthquake of 227/6 BCE.

The dynast and Rhodes came into conflict later in the 3rd century. An inscription from Iasos of the early 210s BCE records that Olympichos had invaded the territory of this coastal polis and that the Rhodians had intervened diplomatically, forcing him to observe the city's freedoms as granted by Philip V of Macedon.
