= Lobolda =

Town of ancient Caria

Coordinates: 37°17′36″N 27°59′38″E

Lobolda (Ancient Greek: Λοβολδα) was a town of ancient Caria, inhabited during the Hellenistic period. Its townspeople appear often in inscriptions recovered in nearby Stratonicea.

Its site is located near Gürbet köy, Asiatic Turkey.
