= Panamara =

Religious centre in ancient Caria

- Πανάμαρα (Ancient Greek)
- Location within Turkey Location within Turkey Aegean
- 37.267700°N 28.098900°E
- Type: Sanctuary
- Satellite of: Stratonicea
- Location: Bağyaka, Muğla Province, Turkey
- Region: Caria

Panamara (Ancient Greek: Πανάμαρα) was a prominent religious centre in ancient Caria. It was the centre of worship for the local god Zeus Panamaros. It was governed by a koinon (a 'federation' or 'collective') called Panamareis (Παναμαρεῖς), which was subsumed into the polis ('city-state') of Stratonicea in the Hellenistic period.

== History ==
Panamara was a historic rural sanctuary in southern Caria. It was situated east of the Hecatomnid satrapy and shows no signs of patronage or political activity in their time. The first inscriptions from Panamara date to the 270s BCE and display rule by Ptolemy II, as would be expected from other communities in Ptolemaic southern Caria such as Halicarnassus and Caunus.

The large city of Stratonicea was founded in the 260s BCE to the northwest of Panamara. This city was a Greco-Macedonian settlement founded by Seleucus II as a powerbase for the Seleucid Empire in Caria, counterbalancing the older city of Mylasa to the west. From the time of Stratonicea's foundation, Panamara was drawn into its territory. Like Lagina, home of a temple to Hecate, religious activity at Panamara became entangled with the civic calendar of Stratonicea.

Like Stratonicea proper, Panamara may have come under Rhodian control in the later 3rd century BCE. It was occupied by Philip V, King of Macedon, in 201 BCE. Monumental construction at Panamara may have begun in this time, perhaps overseen by Stratonicea. A Panamaran inscription notes that Philip V sponsored reconstruction of the sanctuary walls following an earthquake. Antiochos III expelled Philip V from Caria in 197 BCE, returning Panamara to Rhodian control, which was later affirmed by the Peace of Apamea. The control of Caria by Rhodes was supported by Rome, who withdrew their support later in the 2nd century BCE, after which time Panamara became part of the Roman province of Asia Minor alongside Stratonicea. Alongside Mylasa and Aphrodisias, Stratonicea was one of the most important cities in Roman Caria.

Zeus Panamaros made a miraculous appearance at Panamara in 39 BCE. Quintus Labienus was a Roman general and ally of Brutus after his assassination of Julius Caesar. After the death of Brutus, Labienus removed his army from the Parthian frontier and occupied Asia Minor. Stratonicea and Mylasa resisted his invasion, in the course of which the rural mountain sanctuaries of Sinuri and Lagina were sacked. His attempts to do the same to Panamara were repelled by divine epiphany, recorded in detail by an inscription at the site. Allegedly, the soldiers' ladders used to scale the mountain slopes broke underneath them, and they could not advance through thick fog, thunderstorms, and even fire. Meanwhile, 'great is Zeus Panamaros' could be heard through the storms and hallucinations.

As a consequence of the epiphany, not only was the attack by Labienus repelled, but Panamara also received immunity from Roman state interference (asylia) by a senatus consultum of 39 BCE. From this time, Panamara equalled Lagina as an integral religious centre for Stratonicea. The city successfully argued Panamara's case for asylia before the emperor Tiberius when he visited Asia Minor in 23 CE.

Like Labraunda or Sinuri, archaeological evidence shows that Panamara remained an important religious centre even after converting to Christianity in late antiquity and worship of the local pagan god ended. The latest inscriptions of Panamara date to the 4th century CE, suggesting that the community declined in the Byzantine period.

== Religious life ==
=== Festivals ===
There were festivals for both Zeus Panamaros (the Panamareia and Komyria) and Hera (the Heraia). These festivals alternated annually and were heavily gendered. During the Heraia, women of Stratonicea went into the sacred precinct within Panamara, while men waited outside. During the Panamareia, men went into the religious centre, while women waited outside. Although the Komyria was also a male festival for Zeus, it appears to have been a rite of passage for teenagers as young men. The group which entered the sanctuary that year underwent a mystery rite, in which they drank wine and dedicated locks of their hair to the god. The group that waited outside were given wine and olive oil by priests or priestesses.

A fragmentary inscription from the late Hellenistic period specifies the sacrifices to be made at this festival: during the Heraia, Hera received a heifer and Zeus an uncastrated kid. An inscription from the early Roman period gives a glimpse at the sacred calendar of Panamara, which included singing and dancing as well as mass animal sacrifice and feasting.

After the divine epiphany of 39 BCE, Panamara also celebrated a Panamareia. In this festival, the procession moved down from the mountain sanctuary to the town centre, symbolically bringing the god Zeus home. As at Lagina, the entire community at Stratonicea therefore engaged in an annual procession to Panamara, involving about half a day's walk in each direction with two days of feasting at the sanctuary.

Panamara's included traditional bull-sacrifice, called the bouthysia, like Sinuri and Koranza nearby.

=== Zeus Panamaros ===
The site of Panamara was named after the local worshipped there: Zeus Panamaros. It is thought that this epithet was originally a distinct local deity which merged with the Greek god Zeus through syncretism. The phenomenon of religious centres being named after indigenous gods is common throughout Caria, and can be seen elsewhere at Labraunda, Hyllarima, and Sinuri.

Zeus Karios ('Carian Zeus') was the aspect of Zeus worshipped at the site throughout most of the Hellenistic period. The epithet under which Zeus was worshipped definitively changed to Panamaros after his miraculous appearance in 39 BCE, repelling the invasion by Quintus Labienus. This change is reflected on Panamaran coinage.

=== Hera ===
In the Hellenistic period, the god Zeus Panamaros was worshipped as part of a divine couple alongside Hera. She received a separate temple building at Panamara. Worship of Hera was not as integral to local religious as worship of Zeus, especially after the latter's miracle in 39 BCE. Tacitus records that chief gods of Stratonicea in his time were Jupiter (Zeus of Panamara) and Trivia (Hecate of Lagina).

== Excavations ==
Panamara has not been subject to extensive excavations. The site has been damaged by extensive lignite strip mining at Salihpaşalar. The preliminary survey by Alfred Laumonier in the 1930s records the site as it once was, with now-lost temples on a hilltop. Surface fragments at the site include several inscriptions. Some lengths of the original wall survive intact.
