= Ilbir Dağ =

Chain of mountains in modern Turkey

Coordinates: 37°22′34″N 27°34′21″E

Ilbir Dağ, anciently Mount Grium or Mount Grion (Ancient Greek: Γρίον), is a chain of mountains in modern Turkey, running parallel to Mount Latmus (now the Beşparmak Mountains), on the western side of the Latmic bay, and extending from the neighbourhood of Miletus to Euromus in ancient Caria, Anatolia. Some identified this range with that of Phthira mentioned by Homer in the Iliad.
