= Turgut, Muğla =

Turgut Leyne
- Neighbourhood
- Location in Turkey Turgut (Turkey Aegean)
- Coordinates: 37°22′N 28°02′E
- Country: Turkey
- Province: Muğla
- District: Yatağan
- Elevation: 550 m (1,800 ft)
- Population (2022): 1,580
- Time zone: UTC+3 (TRT)
- Postal code: 48500
- Area code: 0252

Turgut is a neighbourhood of the municipality and district of Yatağan, Muğla Province, Turkey. Its population is 1,580 (2022). Before the 2013 reorganisation, it was a town (belde). The distance to Yatağan is 13 kilometres (8.1 mi) and to Muğla is 39 kilometres (24 mi).

== History ==
The ruins of the ancient cult city Lagina are around Turgut, and the alternative name of the town, Leyne, may be a corrupt form of Lagina. The town also houses an old mosque which is claimed to be built by İlyas Bey of Menteşe Beylik in 1311. Another building of historical importance is the mansion of Osman Hamdi Bey, who stayed in Turgut between 1891 and 1893 during Lagina excavations. His house underwent a major restoration and refurbishment work and has opened to the public as a museum.

=== Archaeology ===
Recent studies have shown that the site had been inhabited or employed in an uninterrupted manner during a time span stretching back to the Bronze Age. Seleucid kings conducted a considerable reconstruction effort in the sacred ground of Lagina and transformed it into a foremost religious center of its time, with the nearby (at a distance of 11 kilometers) site of Stratonicea becoming the administrative center. The two sites (Lagina and Stratonicea) were connected to each other in antiquity by a sacred road. The archaeological research conducted in Lagina is historically significant in that it was the first to have been done by a Turkish scientific team, under the direction of Osman Hamdi Bey and Halit Ethem Bey. In 1993, excavation and restoration work was resumed under the guidance of Muğla Museum, by an international team advised by Professor Ahmet Tırpan.

The friezes of the Hecate sanctuary are displayed in the Istanbul Archaeology Museums. Some of the archaeological finds unearthed are on display in Mugla Museum.

== Economy ==
Main economic activity of the town is agriculture. Cereals and olive are the most important crops. There are some olive oil factories. There is a lignite mine around the town. The lignite is used in Yatağan Thermal Power Plant.
