= Phthira =

Mountain in ancient Caria

Phthira (Ancient Greek: Φθίρα) was a mountain in ancient Caria, inhabited by the Phthires, a non-Greek people. It is evidently the same as the Phtheiron oros (Φθειρῶν ὄρος) called "wood-crowned" by Homer in the Iliad, which, according to Hecataeus, was identical with Mount Latmus, but which others supposed to be the same as Mount Grium, running parallel to Mount Latmus.
