= Selimiye, Milas =

Selimiye
- Neighbourhood
- Location in Turkey Selimiye (Turkey Aegean)
- Coordinates: 37.400°N 27.657°E
- Country: Turkey
- Province: Muğla
- District: Milas
- Population (2022): 4,859
- Time zone: UTC+3 (TRT)

Selimiye is a neighbourhood of the municipality and district of Milas, Muğla Province, Turkey. Its population is 4,859 (2022). Before the 2013 reorganisation, it was a town (belde). In the vicinity are the ruins of the ancient city of Euromus.
