= Pierre Devambez =

French Hellenist, archaeologist and historian (1902–1980)

Pierre Devambez (19 November 1902 in Paris – 14 January 1980 in Paris) was a 20th-century French Hellenist, archaeologist and historian of Greek art.

== Biography ==
The son of André Devambez, Pierre Devambez joined the École normale supérieure in 1922 and passed the agrégation des lettres in 1926. A member of the French School at Athens (1928–1933) and of the Institut Français d'Archéologie Orientale, he sojourned in Istanbul from 1933 to 1937 and wrote there the Catalogue des Grands Bronzes.

From 1929 to 1933 he directed the excavations at Thasos, as again in 1953–1954, and the excavations of the Sinuri sanctuary in Caria (1935–1938). He also participated in the work at Xanthos (1950) and, from 1961 to 1963, at Laodicea on the Lycus.

Curator and chief curator of the Department of Greek and Roman antiquities at the Louvre from 1937, he was also in charge of Greek ceramics course at the École du Louvre. Providing classes at the École Normale Supérieure (1954), he moved the classical archeology seminar in the halls of the Louvre.

A director of a seminary in Archaic and Classical Greek religion at the École pratique des hautes études (1961–1967), he was elected a member of the Académie des inscriptions et belles-lettres in 1970 and would preside the international commission of the Corpus vasorum antiquorum.

== Selected publications ==
- 1932: Un quartier romain à Thasos (fouilles de 1925 à 1931)
- 1937: Grands Bronzes du musée de Stamboul
- 1939: La Sculpture grecque
- 1942: Sculptures thasiennes, in Bulletin de correspondance hellénique
- 1944: Le style grec, Larousse
- 1955: L'Art au siècle de Périclès
- 1959: Le Sanctuaire de Sinuri près de Mylasa, with E. Haspels
- 1960: Sculptures grecques
- 1962: Bas-relief de Téos
- 1962: La Peinture grecque
- 1966: Dictionnaire de la civilisation grecque, with R. Flacelière, P. M. Schuhl, R. Martin
- 1978: Grèce, Hachette
- 1983: Le monde non-chrétien, Gallimard.

== Bibliography ==
- 1980: Pierre Demargne, Éloge funèbre de M. Pierre Devambez, in Comptes rendus de l'Académie des inscriptions et belles-lettres
- 1980: F. Villard, Pierre Devambez, in Revue archéologique
- 1981: J. Pouilloux, Notice sur la vie et les travaux de Pierre Devambez, in Comptes rendus de l'Académie des inscriptions et belles-lettres
- 1981: B. Holtzmann, Pierre Devambez 1902-1980, in Encyclopaedia Universalis
- 2007: Eve Gran-Aymerich, Les chercheurs de passé, Éditions du CNRS, 2007, (p. 750–751)
