= Hyllarima =

Ancient city of Caria

- Ὑλλάριμα (Ancient Greek)
- Location within Turkey Location within Turkey Aegean
- 37.505071°N 28.34938°E
- Location: Kapraklar, Muğla Province, Turkey
- Region: Caria

Hyllarima (Ancient Greek: Ὑλλάριμα, Carian: 𐊤𐊣𐊠𐊪𐊹 yλarmi-) was an inland town of northeastern ancient Caria. Its site is located near Mesevle in Asiatic Turkey. Hyllarima is the find-site of about 30 inscriptions and is the type-site of one variant of the Carian alphabets. It governed a number of rural sanctuaries, of which the most notable is that of Zeus Hyllos.

== Name ==
The settlement's name appears in Greek sources as Hyllarima (Ancient Greek: Ὑλλάριμα). This is thought to derive from the epithet of the local deity Zeus Hyllos; Hyllos may originally have been a native Anatolian god which merged with Zeus through syncretism. Similar processes can be seen at Panamara and Labraunda in Caria, whose chief sanctuaries were for Zeus Panamaros and Zeus Labraundos respectively.

The Carian name of Hyllarima is attested as yλarmi- in an inscribed list of "priests of the gods of Hyllarima", qmoλš msoτ yλarmiτ (ʘ𐊪𐊫𐊣𐤭 𐊪𐊰𐊫𐋇 𐊤𐊣𐊠𐊪𐊹𐋇). The form yλarmiτ is inflected, resulting in the syncope of the original medial vowel /i/ which survives in the Greek form.

The archaic form of Hyllarima might be Wallarima, which is attested in Hittite texts of the 2nd millennium BCE as the name of a community in this region, alongside nearby Iyalanda (Alinda).

It is thought that the otherwise-unknown toponym Kaprima (Ancient Greek: Κάπριμα), the site of Eupolemus' defeat by Ptolemaeus according to Diodorus Siculus, is a corruption of Hyllarima. This corruption corresponds with the well-known alternation between initial /h-/ and /k-/ in Carian toponyms, such as in Hydai/Kydai or Hyromos/Kyramos/Euromos.

== History ==
If Wallarima is an early mention of Hyllarima, the community may have existed as early as the 14th century BCE. Excavations have shown that the community moved from one fortified hilltop settlement (modern Asarcıktepe) to another nearby (modern Kapraklar) sometime in the 4th century BCE.

The political history of Hyllarima is poorly known before the Hellenistic period. The earliest known inscription from the vicinity shows that it recognised the conquest of Alexander the Great; it gives its date of creation "(in) the kingship of Philip". Carian: (𐊾𐊠) 𐊽𐊾𐊲𐊸𐊫 𐊷𐊹𐋃𐊹𐊷𐊲𐊰, (δa) kδuśo Pilipus.

Because Philip III Arrhidaeus was only king in name, Hyllarima was probably under the control of Asander, satrap of Caria since the Partition of Babylon, at this time (c. 323 – c. 313 BCE). Antigonus I subsequently conquered Caria. Hyllarima was later governed by the dynast Pleistarchus, who fortified the hilltop in the 290s BCE. A proxeny inscription from the time of Pleistarchus shows that Hyllarima had adopted the institutions of a Greek polis by the 3rd century, whose chief magistrate was the eponymous archon.

Hyllarima fell under Seleucid control by the 260s BCE, during the joint rule of Antiochos I and his son, the future Antiochos II. It then became part of the Rhodian Peraia as a result of the Treaty of Apamea and was eventually absorbed into Roman Asia. Hyllarima remained an important local religious centre throughout the Roman period; a dedication of the 2nd century CE compares the emperor Antoninus Pius to Zeus Hyllos. After converting to Christianity, Hyllarima was the seat of a bishop in antiquity. It no longer has a residential bishop today but still remains a titular see of the Roman Catholic Church.

According to Stephanus of Byzantium, Hierocles, an athlete who later became a philosopher, was from there.

== Excavations ==
The site was excavated by a joint French-Turkish team led by Pierre Debord and Ender Varinlioğlu from 1997. Their findings were published in 2018.

The main theatre, built in the 2nd–1st centuries BCE, suggests that the town had a maximum population of approximately 1,500 at the time. It is still visible today.

The city’s agora has structures from the Classical, Hellenistic, and Roman periods.
