= Menippus of Stratonikeia =

Menippus of Stratonikeia (Ancient Greek: Μένιππος ὁ Στρατονικεύς Menippos o Stratonikeus, lived 1st century BC), surnamed Catocas, was a Carian by birth, born in the city of Stratonicea. He was the most accomplished orator of his time in all Asia (79 BC). Cicero, who heard him, puts him almost on a level with the Attic orators.
