= Muğla Museum =

Museum in Muğla, Turkey

- Muğla Müzesi
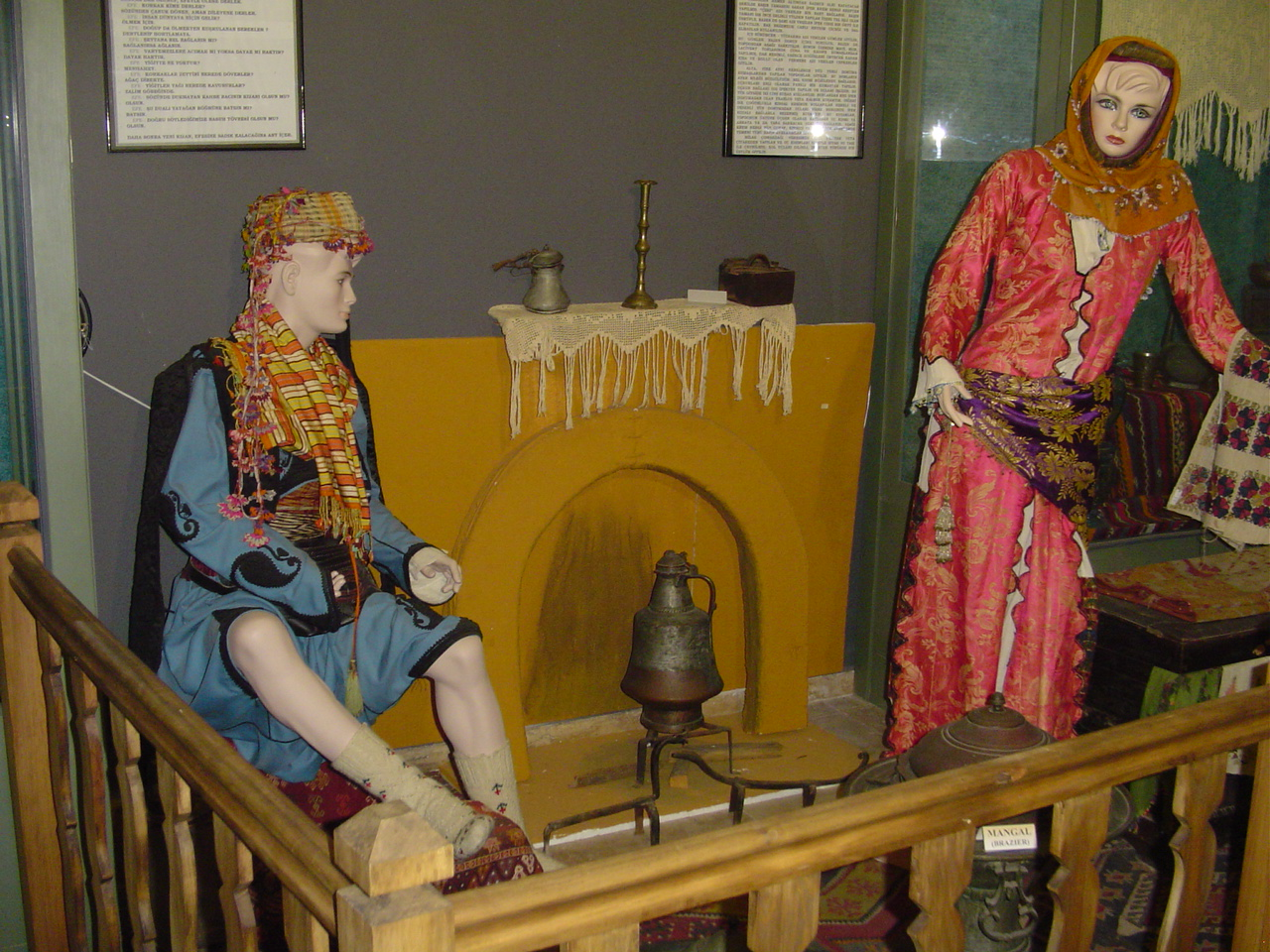
- From ethnography section

- Location within Turkey
- Established: 1994; 32 years ago
- Location: Müştak Bey caddesi
- Coordinates: 37°13′02″N 28°22′05″E
- Type: Natural history, Archaeology, Ethnography
- Collections: 5460
- Owner: Ministry of Culture

Muğla Museum is a museum in Muğla, Turkey. It is a general purpose museum combining natural history, archaeology and ethnography. The museum building, which is located on Müştak Bey street, is the former prison of Muğla city. The building was restored and opened as a museum in 1994.

One section of the museum exhibits the fossils of animals that lived 5-9 million years ago (i.e., Turolian period) from Kaklıcatepe, a hill close to Muğla. Another section focuses on archaeology; finds from excavations in Stratonicea excavations are exhibited in this area. There is also a skeleton of a gladiator. In ethnography section clothes and everyday tools from Muğla area are exhibited. There are 5460 items in the museum.
