= Kasossos =

Town of ancient Caria

Coordinates: 37°13′49″N 27°48′45″E

Kasossos (Ancient Greek: Κασωσσος) was a town of ancient Caria. It evidently contained an important temple or sanctuary that was shown favour by the Hecatomnids when they ruled Caria. Its townspeople appear in ancient inscriptions recovered in Caria.

Its site is located near Ulaş, Asiatic Turkey.
