= Pladasa =

Town of ancient Caria

Coordinates: 37°05′14″N 28°04′47″E

Pladasa was a town of ancient Caria. Its name does not appear in ancient authors, but is inferred from epigraphic evidence. It was a polis (city-state) and a member of the Delian League. There was a strong Carian presence in the town's ethnic makeup.

Its site is located near Çandüşüren, Asiatic Turkey.
