= Yatağan, Muğla =

Yatağan
- District and municipality
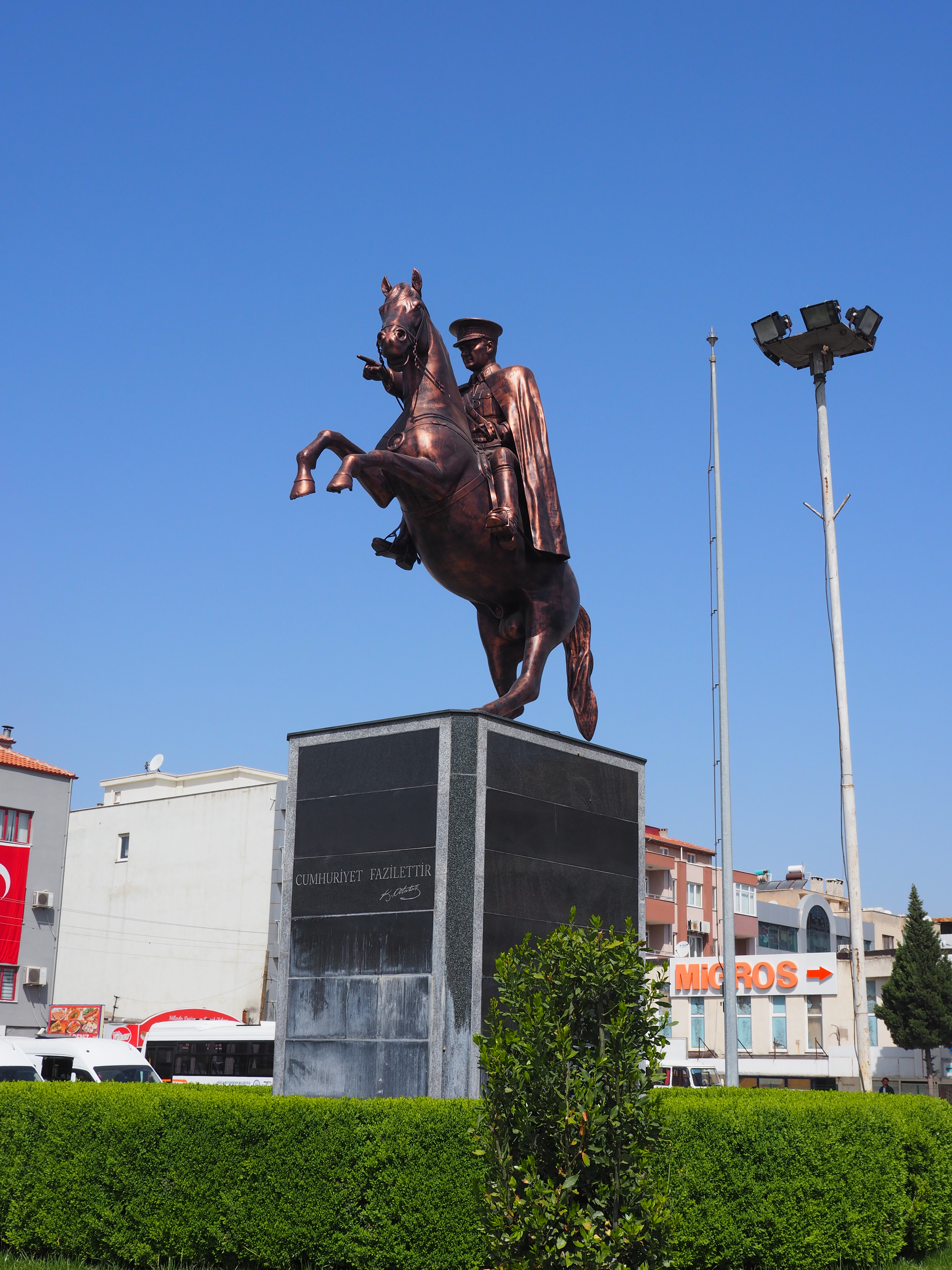

- Map showing Yatağan District in Muğla Province

- Location within Turkey Location within Turkey Aegean
- Coordinates: 37°20′33″N 28°08′22″E
- Country: Turkey
- Province: Muğla

Government
  - Mayor: Mesut Günay (CHP)
- Area: 851 km^{2} (329 sq mi)
- Population (2022): 45,283
  - Density: 53.2/km^{2} (138/sq mi)
- Time zone: UTC+3 (TRT)
- Postal code: 48500
- Area code: 0252
- Website: www.yatagan.bel.tr

Yatağan is a municipality and district of Muğla Province, Turkey. Its area is 851 km^{2}, and its population is 45,283 (2022). It is about 26 km (16 mi) north of Muğla.

== Sights of interest ==
The ruins of Stratonicea, one of the most important cities of ancient Caria, is situated 7 km west of Yatağan off the road to Milas.

A spot of interest is the village of Çaybükü on the road to Muğla. The village has an old and restored coffee house, Belen Kahvesi, mentioned in a nationally renowned song called "Ormancı", which has as theme a tragic event that took place there in 1946. The coffee house is a tourist attraction today both because of the curiosity aroused by the song and also due to its views of the surrounding plain. Once again, Çaybükü had a different official name, Gevenes, until the 1950s and that name is still used locally. An unsuccessful petition was even made by the inhabitants in 2006 for a return to the former name, but while the Ministry of Interior Affairs could accept Geven, it did not accept Gevenes. The village is referred to by name in the song, under its former official name of Gevenes.

== Composition ==
There are 50 neighbourhoods in Yatağan District:

- Akgedik
- Akyol
- Alaşar
- Atatürk
- Bağyaka
- Bahçeyaka
- Bencik
- Bozarmut
- Bozüyük
- Çakırlar
- Çamlıca
- Cazkırlar
- Çukuröz
- Cumhuriyet
- Dere
- Deştin
- Doğanköy
- Elmacık
- Esenköy
- Eskihisar
- Gökgedik
- Gökpınar
- Hacıbayramlar
- Hacıveliler
- Hisarardı
- Kadıköy
- Kafacakaplancık
- Kapubağ
- Katrancı
- Kavak
- Kırıkköy
- Köklük
- Konak
- Kozağaç
- Madenler
- Mesken
- Nebiköy
- Şahinler
- Şeref
- Turgut
- Turgutlar
- Yava
- Yayla
- Yeni
- Yenikarakuyu
- Yeniköy
- Yeşilbağcılar
- Yeşilköy
- Yukarıyayla
- Zeytinköy

== Coal pollution ==
Since the 1990s the town has attracted world attention due to ecological pollution by the nearby coal-fired power station, one of the oldest coal-fired power stations in the country. There have been campaigns to shut it down by Greenpeace since 1994, and several shutdown court orders have been issued, only to be overruled or ignored because of an energy shortage at that time.
