= Chrysaorian League =

Federation of cities

The Chrysaorian League (Ancient Greek: σύστημα Χρυσαορικόν, systema Chrysaorikon) was an informal loose federation of several cities in ancient region of Caria, Anatolia that was apparently formed in the early Seleucid period and lasted at least until 203 BC. The League had its primary focus on unified defense, and secondarily on trade, and may have been linked by ethnic bonds (the Chrysaorians). It had an assembly and financial institutions, and a form of reciprocal citizenship whereby a citizen of a member city was entitled to certain rights and privileges in any other member city. The capital of the League was Chrysaorium where the assembly met.

Other member cities included: Alabanda (renamed Antiochia of the Chrysaorians), Alinda, Amyzon, Ceramus, Mylasa, Kaunos, Stratonicea, Thera.

For periods of time, some of the member cities were subject to Rhodes as part of the Rhodian Peraea.
