= Chrysaoris =

Town of ancient Caria

Coordinates: 37°20′33″N 28°05′48″E

Chrysaoris (Ancient Greek: Χρυσαορίς) was a town of ancient Caria, perhaps afterwards called Idrias (Ἰδριάς). According to Apollonius, in his Carica, it was the first city which was founded by the Lycians. According to Marcus Mettius Epaphroditus, all Caria was called Chrysaoris. Herodotus mentions a district in Caria, named Idrias, in which the river Marsyas (Çine Çay) had its source. Later, Antiochus built the city of Stratonicea there.

Its site is tentatively located near Şahinler, Asiatic Turkey.
