= Olymos =

Ancient city of Caria

Coordinates: 37°22′43″N 27°44′08″E

Olymos (Ancient Greek: Ὄλυμος) or Olymon (Ὄλυμον) or Hylimos (Ὕλιμος) was a town of ancient Caria. It was a polis (city-state) and a member of the Delian League.

Its site is located near Kafaca, Asiatic Turkey. Many inscriptions of the Hellenistic period have been recovered from the site.
