= Apollonius of Aphrodisias =

Apollonius of Aphrodisias (Ancient Greek: Άπολλώνιος ὁ Ἀφροδισιεύς) in Cilicia is described in the Suda as a high priest and a historian.

He is said to have written a work on the town of Tralles (Περὶ Τράλλεων), a second on the mythological figure Orpheus and his mysteries (Περὶ Ὀρφέως καὶ τῶν τελετῶν αὐτοῦ), and a third on the history of Caria (Καρικὰ), of which the eighteenth book is mentioned, and which is often referred to by Stephanus of Byzantium.
