= Hydai =

Town of ancient Caria

Coordinates: 37°16′57″N 27°41′13″E

Hydai or Kydai was a town of ancient Caria. Its name does not appear in ancient authors, but is inferred from epigraphic evidence; its demonym was Hydaieis (Ancient Greek: Ὑδαιεῖς) or Kydaieis (Κυδαιεῖς). It was a polis (city-state) and a member of the Delian League.

Its site is located near Damlarboğaz, Asiatic Turkey. It has been partially excavated and some of the artifacts are displayed at the Milas Museum.
