= Euromus =

Ancient city in Turkey

- Εὔρωμος (Greek)
- Eunomus, Eunomos, Kyromus, Hyromus
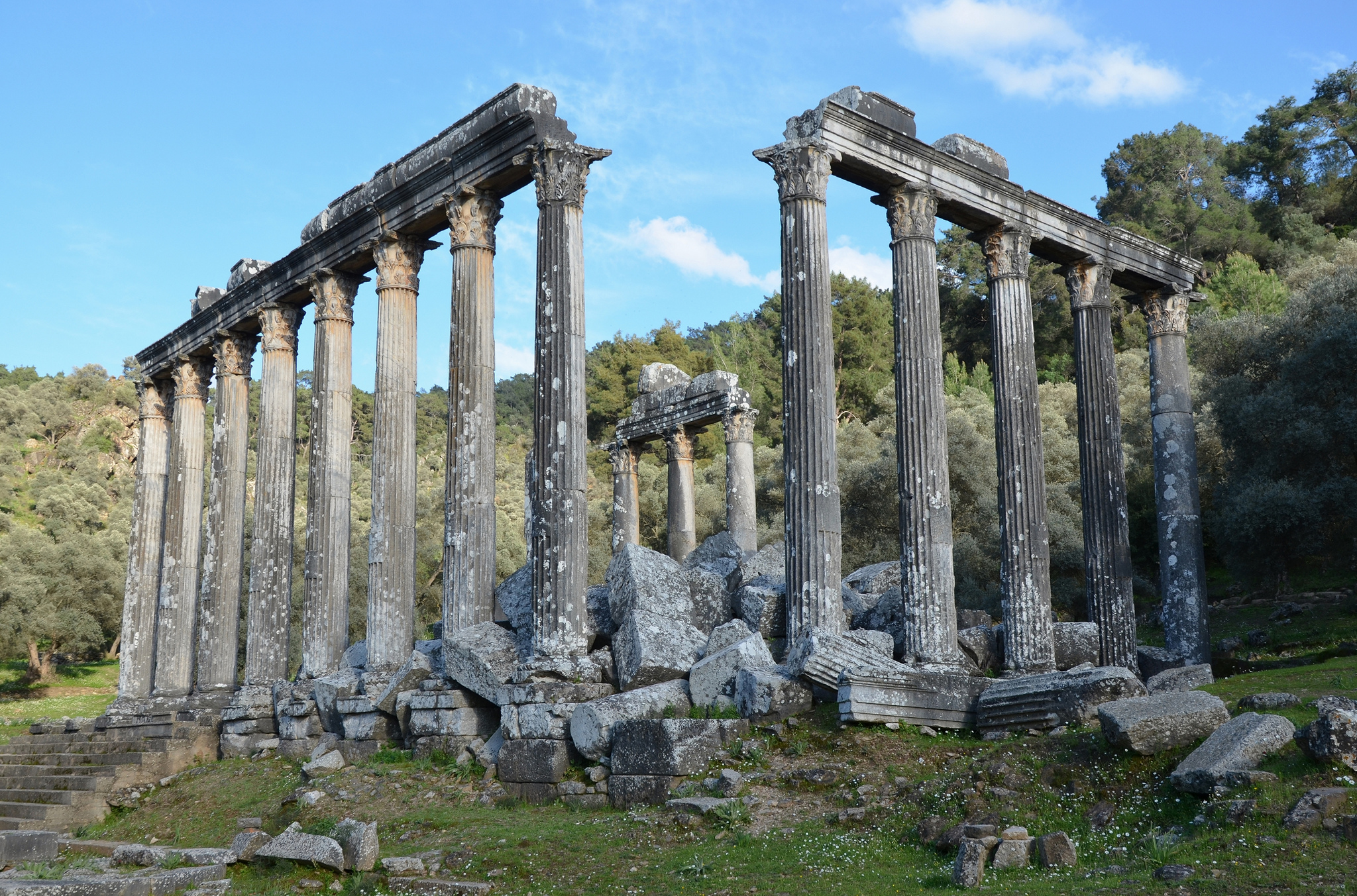
- The Temple of Zeus Lepsinos at Euromus

- Location within Turkey
- 37°22′27″N 27°40′31″E
- Type: Settlement
- Location: Kızılcakuyu, Muğla Province, Turkey
- Region: Caria

Euromus or Euromos (Ancient Greek: Εὔρωμος and Εὔροωμος) – also, Europus or Europos (Εὐρωπός), Eunomus or Eunomos (Εὔνωμος), Philippi or Philippoi (Φίλιπποι); earlier Kyromus and Hyromus – was an ancient city in Caria, Anatolia; the ruins are approximately 4 km southeast of Selimiye and 12 km northwest of Milas (the ancient Mylasa), Muğla Province, Turkey. It was situated at the foot of Mount Grium, which runs parallel to Mount Latmus, and was built by one Euromus, a son of Idris, a Carian.

== History ==
Probably dating from the 6th century BC, Euromus was a member of the Chrysaorian League during Seleucid times. Euromus also minted its own coins from the 2nd century BCE to the 2nd century CE. Under the Roman dominion Euromus belonged to the conventus of Alabanda.

The ruins contain numerous interesting buildings, the most outstanding of which is the temple of Zeus Lepsinos from the reign of Emperor Hadrian.

=== Archaeology ===
Archaeologists have found terra cotta shards indicating that the temple site had its origins back at least to the 6th century BC. The temple is one of the best preserved classical temples in Turkey: sixteen columns remain standing and most of the columns are inscribed in honour of the citizen who commissioned their construction. Carian rock-cut tombs are also found at Euromus.

In July 2021, archaeologists led by Abuzer Kızıl have announced the discovery of two 2,500-year-old marble statues and an inscription during excavations at the Temple of Zeus Lepsynos. According to Abuzer Kızıl, one of the statues was naked while other was wearing armor made of leather and a short skirt. Both of the statues were depicted with a lion in their hands.

== Gallery ==
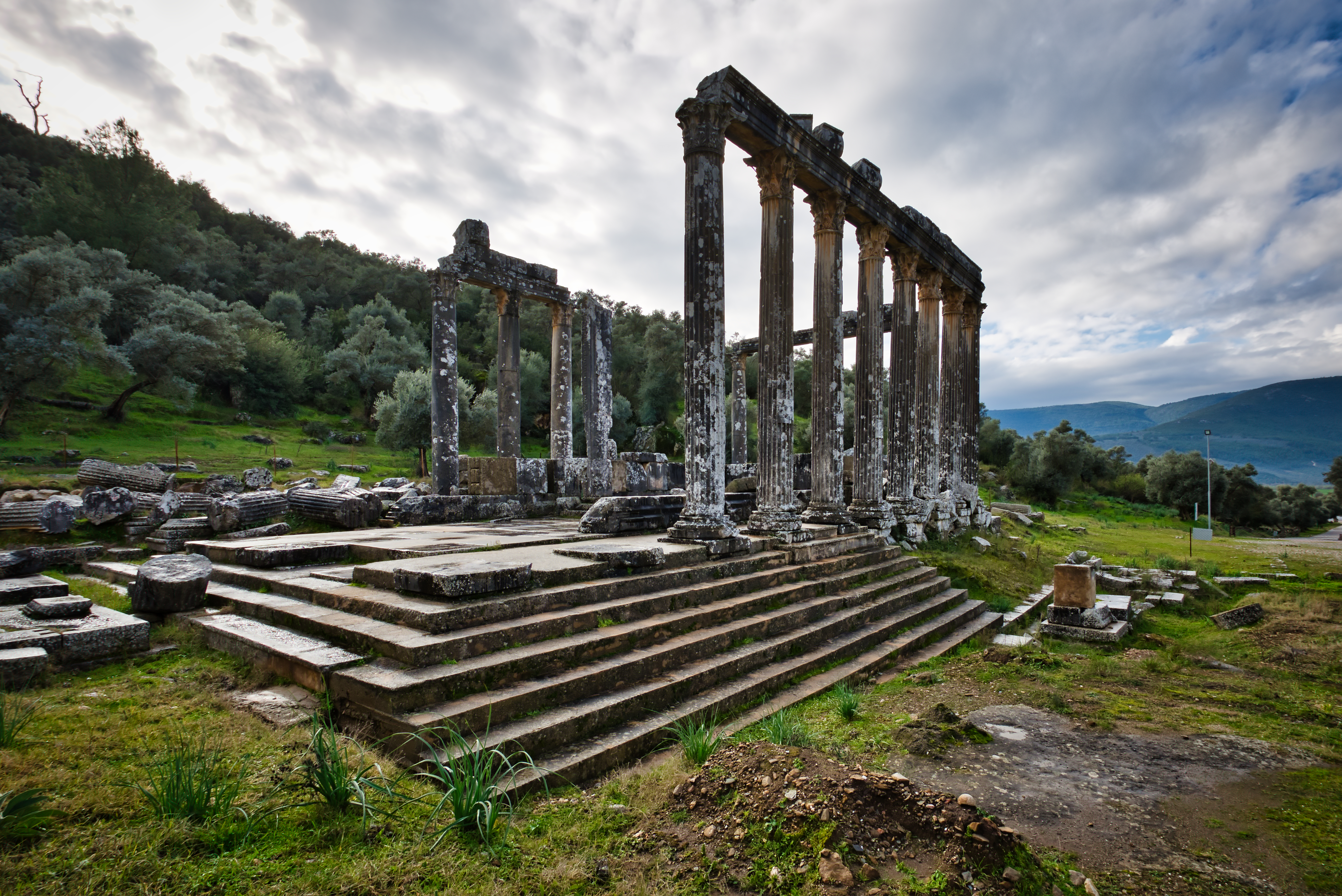
Side view of the Temple of Zeus

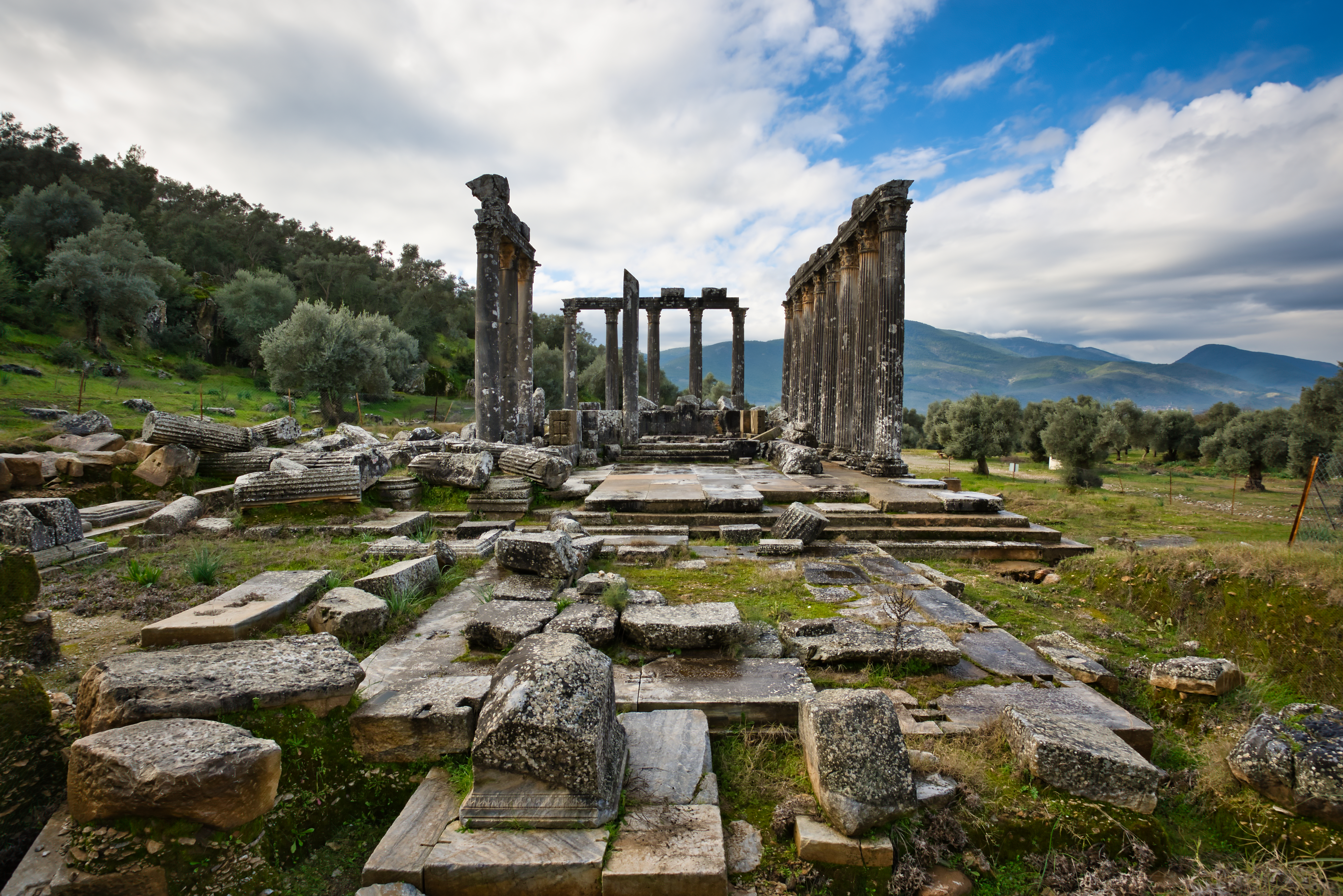
Front view of the Temple of Zeus
