= Stratonicea (Caria) =

Ancient city in Caria (Turkey)

- Στρατoνικεια / Στρατoνικη / Στρατονίκεια (Greek)
- Stratonikeia, Stratoniceia, Stratoniki, Stratonike, Stratonice, Idrias, Chrysaoris, Hadrianopolis
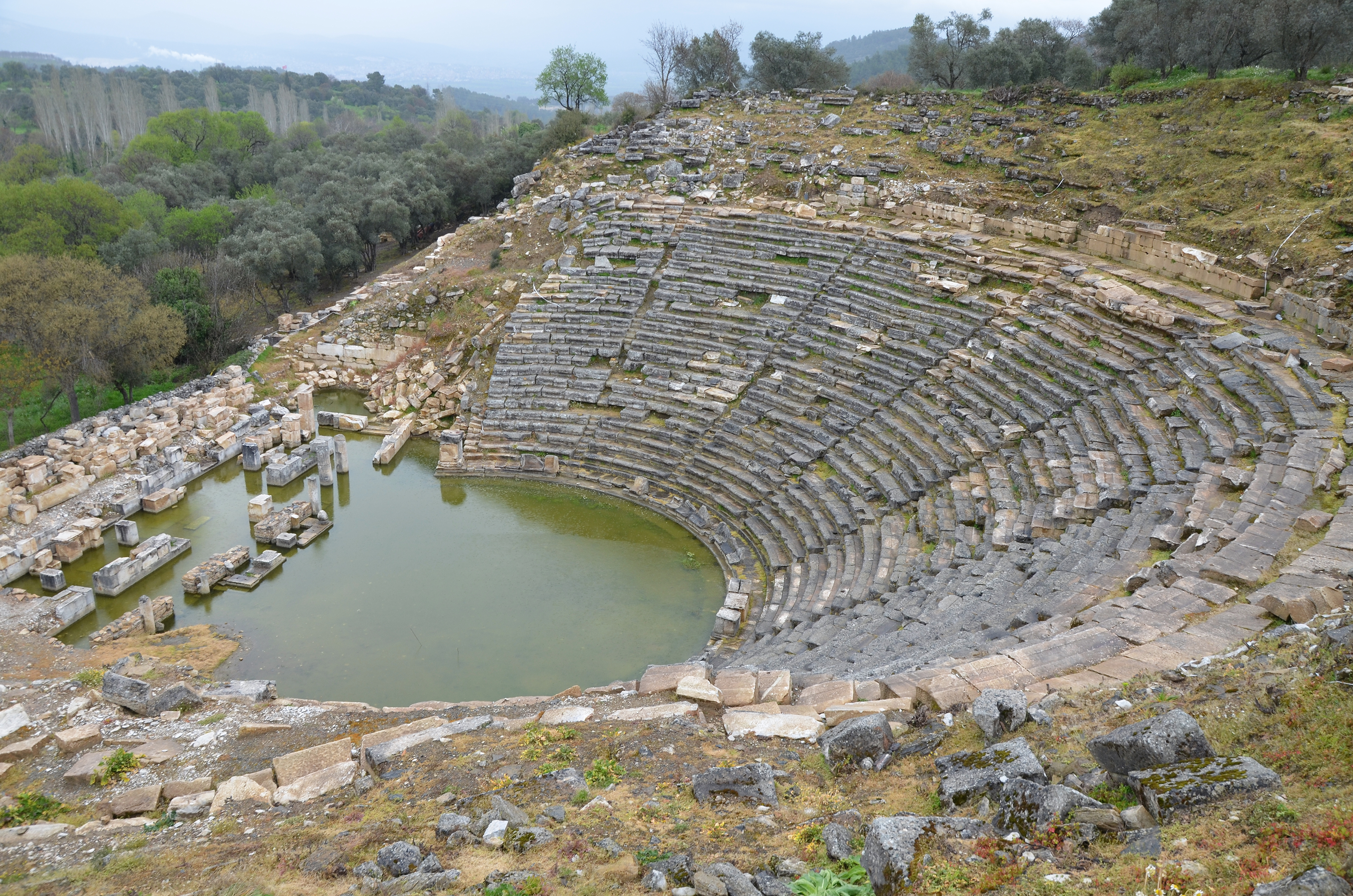
- The theatre in Stratonicea

- Location within Turkey
- 37°18′53″N 28°03′57″E
- Type: Settlement
- Location: Eskihisar, Muğla Province, Turkey
- Region: Caria

History
- Built by: Antiochus I Soter

Stratonicea (Hittite: 𒀜𒊑𒅀 Atriya, Ancient Greek: Στρατoνικεια or Στρατoνικη; or per Stephanus of Byzantium: Στρατονίκεια) – also transliterated as Stratonikeia, Stratoniceia, Stratoniki, and Stratonike and Stratonice; a successor settlement to Chrysaoris; and for a time named Hadrianopolis – was one of the most important towns in the interior of ancient Caria, Anatolia, situated on the east-southeast of Mylasa, and on the south of the river Marsyas; its site is now located at the present village of Eskihisar, Muğla Province, Turkey. It is situated at a distance of 1 km (0.62 mi) from the intercity road D.330 that connects the district center of Yatağan with Bodrum and Milas, shortly before Yatağan power station if one has taken departure from the latter towns.

== History ==
=== Late Bronze Age ===
Some scholars identified the city of Atriya from the Hittite documents as Stratonicea. Atriya played an important role during the conflict between the Mycenean Greek colonists (Ahhiyawa) and native Anatolians. During the reign of the Hittite Great King Tudhaliya IV, Utima and Atriya were a part of the Hittite territory while Awarna and Pina were controlled by the king of Milawata which was in turn controlled by the Ahhiyawans. In the historical document called the Milawata Letter, Hittite Great King Tudhaliya IV makes a complaint about the attitude of the King of Milawata. He mentions that he sent the hostages from Utima and Atriya to Milawata while the King of Milawata did not send him the hostages from Awarna and Pina, therefore not honoring his part of the hostage exchange deal.

=== Classical Age ===
==== Hellenistic period ====
According to Strabo, the city was founded by the Seleucid king Antiochus I Soter (281–261 BC), who named it after his wife Stratonice. Or at least this is what has been generally told; some historians have contested this date as too early, and proposed to consider the city's founder Stratonice's son, Antiochus II Theos, or, later still, Antiochus III the Great.

What seems certain is that the city was founded on the site of an old Carian town, Idrias, anciently called Chrysaoris, said to be the first town founded by the Lycians. Later it passed under the control of the Achaemenid Empire. According to Athens' tribute "assessment" of 425 BC Idrias was supposed to be responsible for the payment of the considerable sum of six talents. Like many other non-Greek cities on the 425 BC assessment Idrias is never recorded actually paying any tribute to Athens and was never a member of the Delian League. In early Seleucid times, Stratonikeia was a member of the Chrysaorian League, a confederation of Carian towns. The Stratonikeians, though of Macedonian rather than Carian origin, were admitted into the confederacy because of the Carian towns and villages within their territory. The league is attested by an inscription already in 267 BC, but was probably older still. Near the town was the temple of Zeus Chrysaoreus, at which the League's assembly met; at these meetings several city-states had votes in proportion to the number of towns they possessed.

The rural sanctuaries of Hekate at Lagina and Zeus at Panamara were absorbed into the territory of Stratonicea when the city was founded, receiving monumental temples at which the Stratoniceans would process to and worship every year.

Under the succeeding Seleucid kings, Stratonikeia was adorned with splendid and costly buildings. At a later time in the 3rd century BC it was ceded to the Rhodians. Rhodes seems to have then temporarily lost it, possibly during king Philip V of Macedon's Carian campaign (201–198 BC), but it retook control of the place in 197 BC, keeping it until 167 BC when the whole of Caria was declared free by the Roman Republic. From this point starts the city's independent coinage, which was to last until the times of the emperor Gallienus (253–268). In 130 BC the city had a central role in the revolt led against the Romans, since here the self-proclaimed king Aristonicus made a last stand before falling into the hands of his enemies with the fall of the city.

=== Roman period ===
Some time after, in 88 BC, Mithridates VI of Pontus (120–63 BC), after imposing a fine and a garrison on the city, resided for some time at Stratonikeia, and married Monime, the daughter of Philopoemen, one of its principal citizens. Then came in 40 BC the siege sustained against Quintus Labienus and his Parthian troops, and the brave resistance it offered to him entitled it to the gratitude of Augustus and the Senate. The alleged divine intervention against Quintus Labienus by Zeus at Panamara led to the elevation of that sanctuary, in the hinterland of Stratonikeia, to one favoured by the city. The emperor Hadrian is said to have taken this town under his special protection, and to have changed its name into Hadrianopolis, a name, however, which may (also) refer to another town also called Stratonikeia. Pliny enumerates it among free cities in Anatolia. Menippus, according to Cicero one of the most distinguished orators of his time, was a native of Stratonikeia.

== Archaeology ==
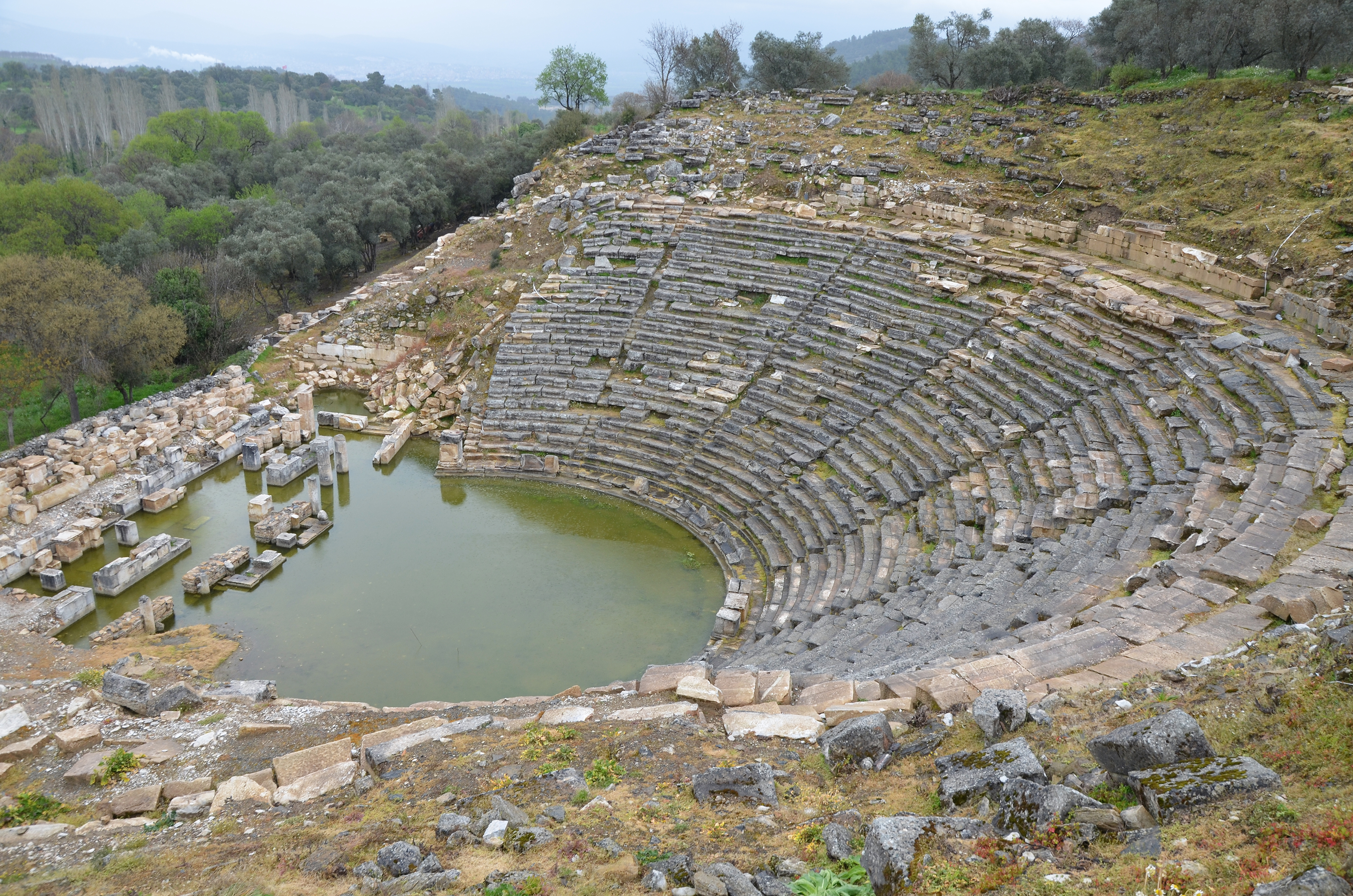
The theater

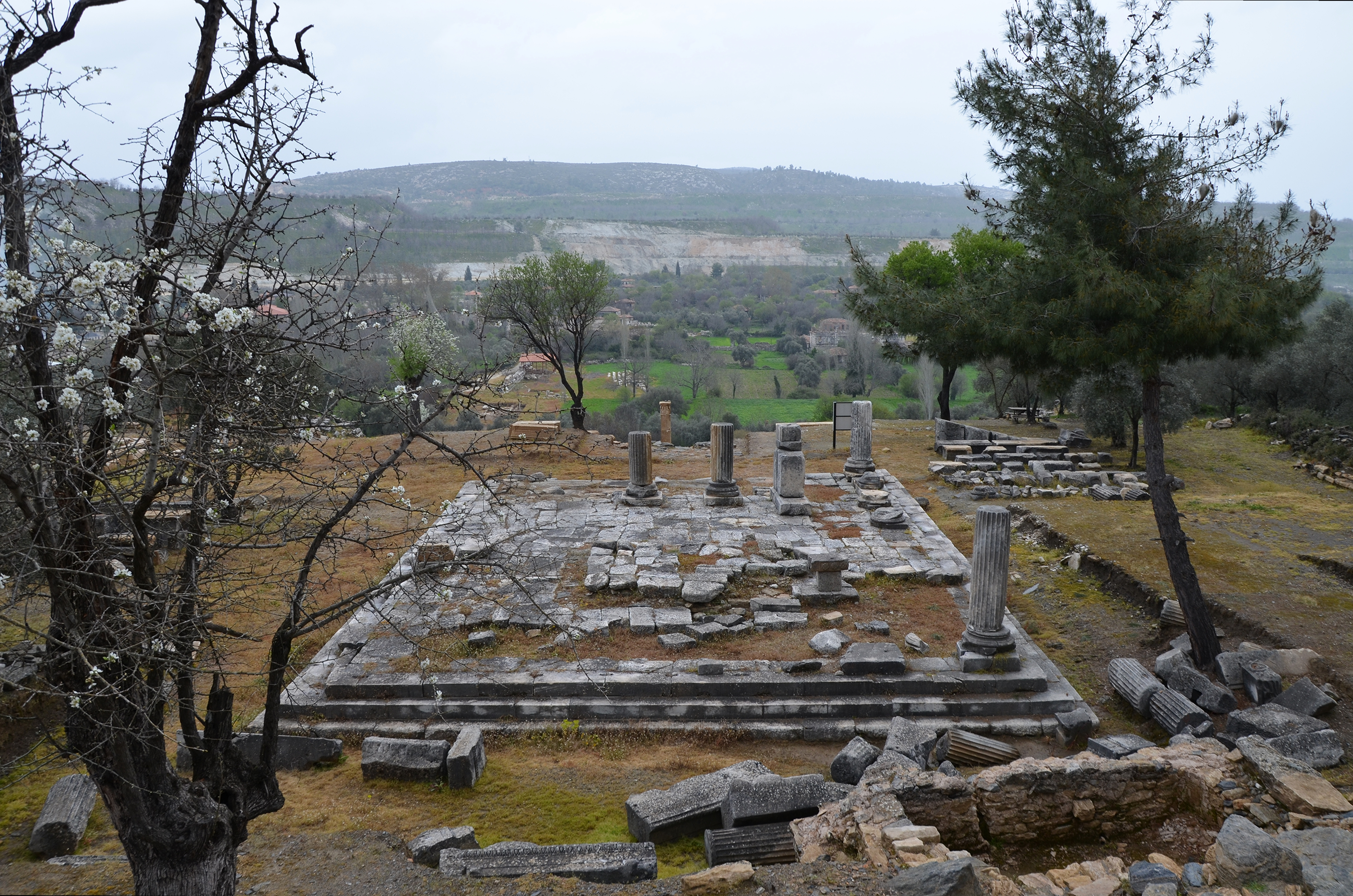
The peripteral temple on the north slope of the acropolis

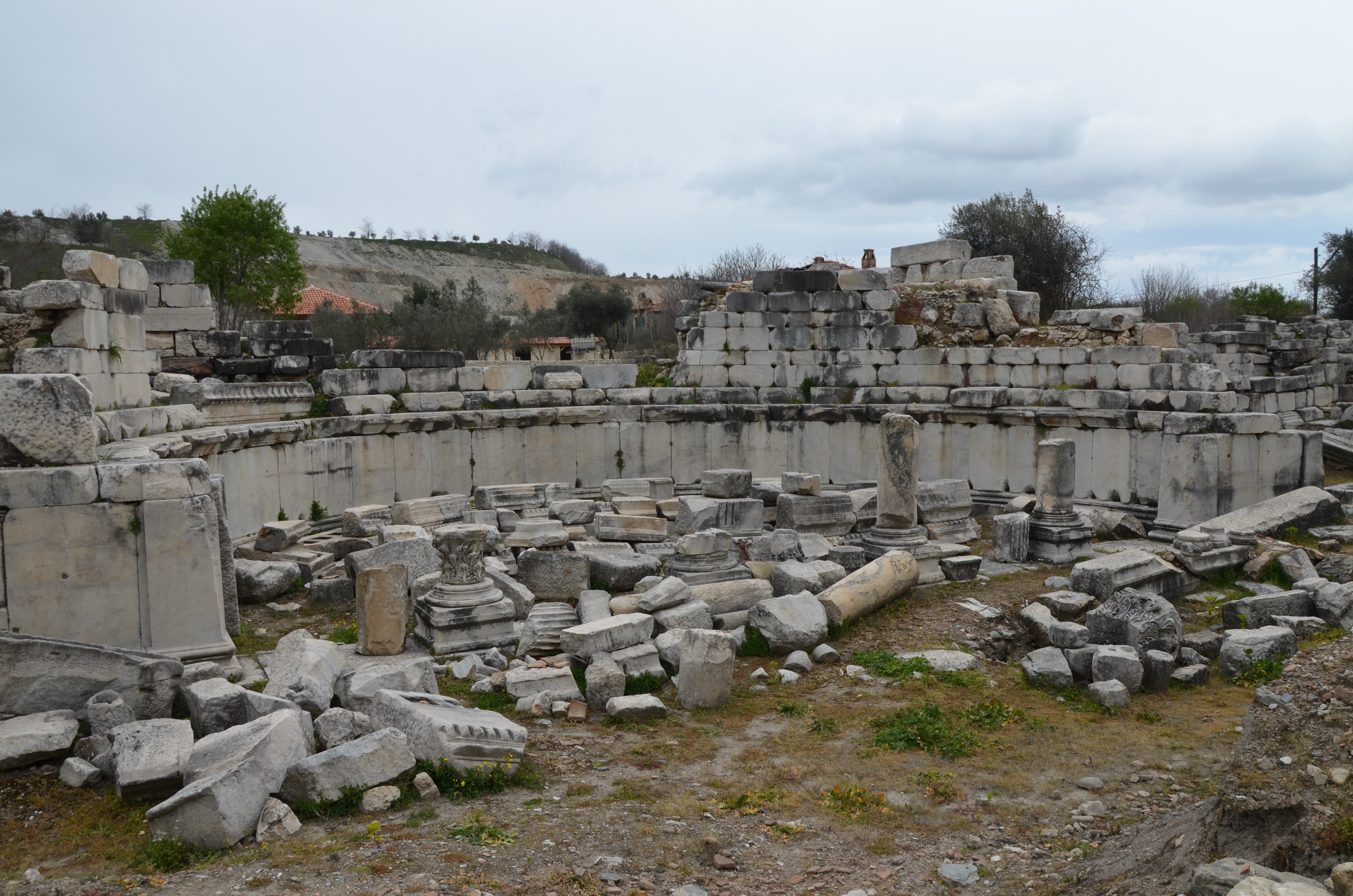
The central exedra on the north side of the gymnasium

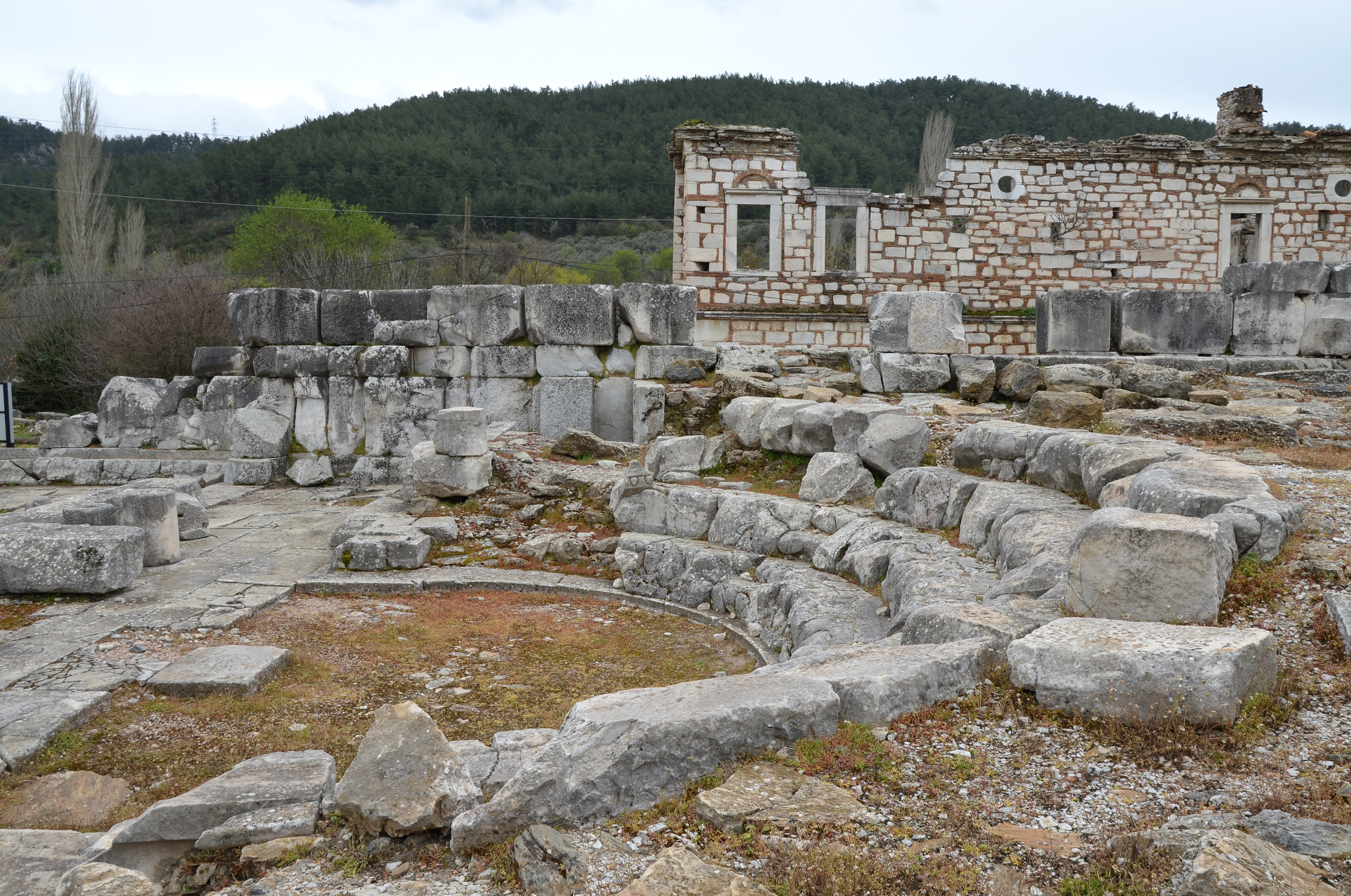
The interior of the bouleuterion

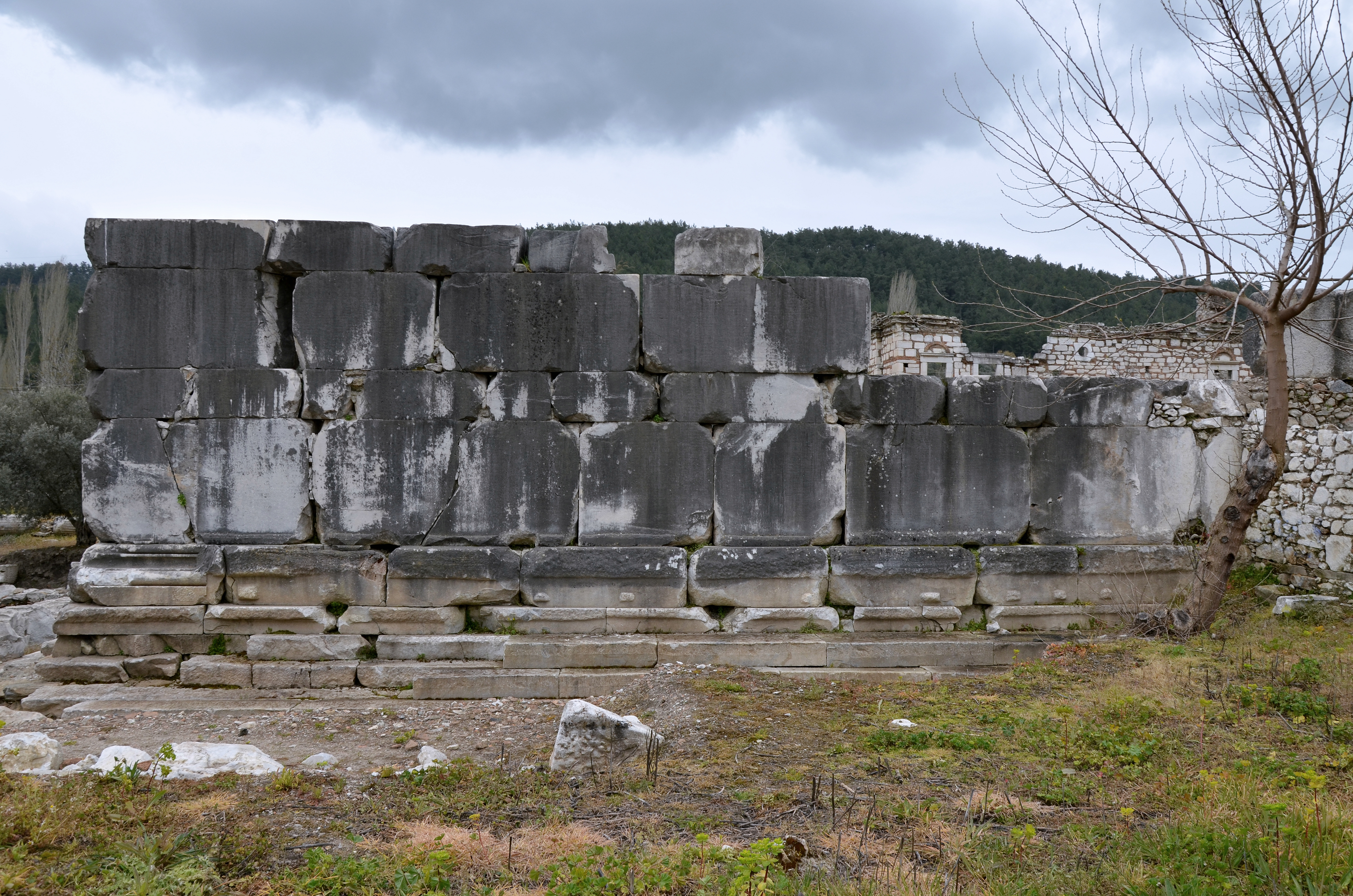
The north wall of the bouleuterion, bearing a copy of Diocletian's price edict and other inscriptions

Although human habitation in the region extends back to the early Bronze Age, and the existence of an Archaic and Classical settlement at the site is attested by the remains of earlier fortifications at Kadıkulesi hill, almost all of the visible remains date to the Hellenistic and Roman periods.

=== Theater ===
The theater, with a capacity of c. 12,000, was located south of the center of the city at the northern foot of Kadıkulesi hill. Originally constructed in the Hellenistic period, it was remodeled in the early Imperial period (1st century AD), when the scene building was entirely rebuilt. Additional changes were made in the 2nd century AD, and the theater continued to function until the 4th century.

=== Peripteral temple ===
On a terrace on the hillside south of the theater was a small peripteral temple in the Ionic order, measuring ca. 12.5 x 18.5 m, with the entrance facing north toward the theater. The style of the building and its decoration point to a date in the early Imperial period (1st century AD), and an inscription suggests that it was dedicated to the Imperial cult.

=== Gymnasium ===
In the northwestern part of the city is a large structure identified as a gymnasium. The estimated overall dimensions are 105 x 267 m, which would make it the largest known gymnasium in the classical world. Only the north side of the complex has been excavated; it is divided into a series of five rooms, the central one semicircular, those on either side rectangular, separated from the open courtyard to the south by columns. Originally constructed in the second quarter of the 2nd century BC, it was remodeled in the Augustan and Antonine periods.

=== Bouleuterion ===
Southeast of the gymnasium stands a well-preserved bouleuterion (previously thought to be a temple of Serapis), measuring c. 25 x 30 m, with semicircular rows of seats and a courtyard to the east. It has been variously dated to the 1st or 2nd century AD. The north wall of the building is covered with Greek and Latin inscriptions, including a partial Latin text of Diocletian's price edict, and a Greek mnemonic poem listing the months of the year and attributed to Menippus, the orator from Stratoniceia praised by Cicero.

=== North gate and nymphaeum ===
In the center of the north side of the circuit wall surrounding the Hellenistic and Roman city was a monumental gate, which marked the point at which the road from the sanctuary of Hekate at Lagina entered the city. It consisted of a pair of arched gateways with a total width of c. 42.5 m. Between the two gateways on the side facing the city was a semicircular nymphaeum decorated with two tiers of Corinthian columns and niches for statues. It has been dated to the late Antonine or early Severan period, with many later repairs. In front of the nymphaeum was an open square from which a broad colonnaded street, c. 8.70 m wide, continued south to the center of the city. During repairs in the 4th and 5th centuries AD the original Corinthian columns flanking the road were replaced with Doric, and mosaic floors were added in the eastern portico.

=== Roman baths and latrine ===
The remains of one Roman bath, dated to the 2nd century AD, have been excavated in the western part of the city. Two other baths are attested by inscriptions. Near the western bath is a Roman public latrine with a capacity of c. 60 people.

== Christian remains and episcopal see ==
In 2021, archaeologists excavated a church which was built after the earthquake of 365 AD and continued in use until the 7th century, after which the area was used as a cemetery.

The Notitiae Episcopatuum mention the see of Stratonicea up to the 13th century among the suffragans of Stauropolis. Only three of its bishops are known, by their signatures at councils:

- Eupeithus, at the Council of Chalcedon (451);
- Theopemptus, at the Council of Constantinople (692); and
- Gregory, at the Council of Nicaea (787).

The ancient bishopric of Stratonicea in Caria is included in the Catholic Church's list of titular sees. No further titular bishop of this eastern see has been appointed since the Second Vatican Council.

- Antonio Stoppani, (13 Jun 1917 Appointed - 6 Aug 1940)
- Joseph Cucherousset, (9 Apr 1948 Appointed - 14 Sep 1955 )
- Carlos Guillermo
- Hartl de Laufen, (9 Nov 1956 Appointed - 6 Feb 1977 )

== Modern era ==
The site of Stratonicea is partly occupied by the Turkish village of Eskihisar. Much of the surrounding area, including part of the site's necropolis, was destroyed by the opening of a pit to extract the lignite reserves that feed the nearby Yatağan power plant. The pit is proposed to be transformed into a lake in the coming years, once the reserves there are exhausted. The village has a local museum, which contains mostly Roman remains, but also some earlier material, including an Early Bronze Age spouted jug of the 3rd millennium BC and two Submycenaean vases dated to the 12th or 11th century BC.
