= Muğla =

City in southwestern Turkey

- City
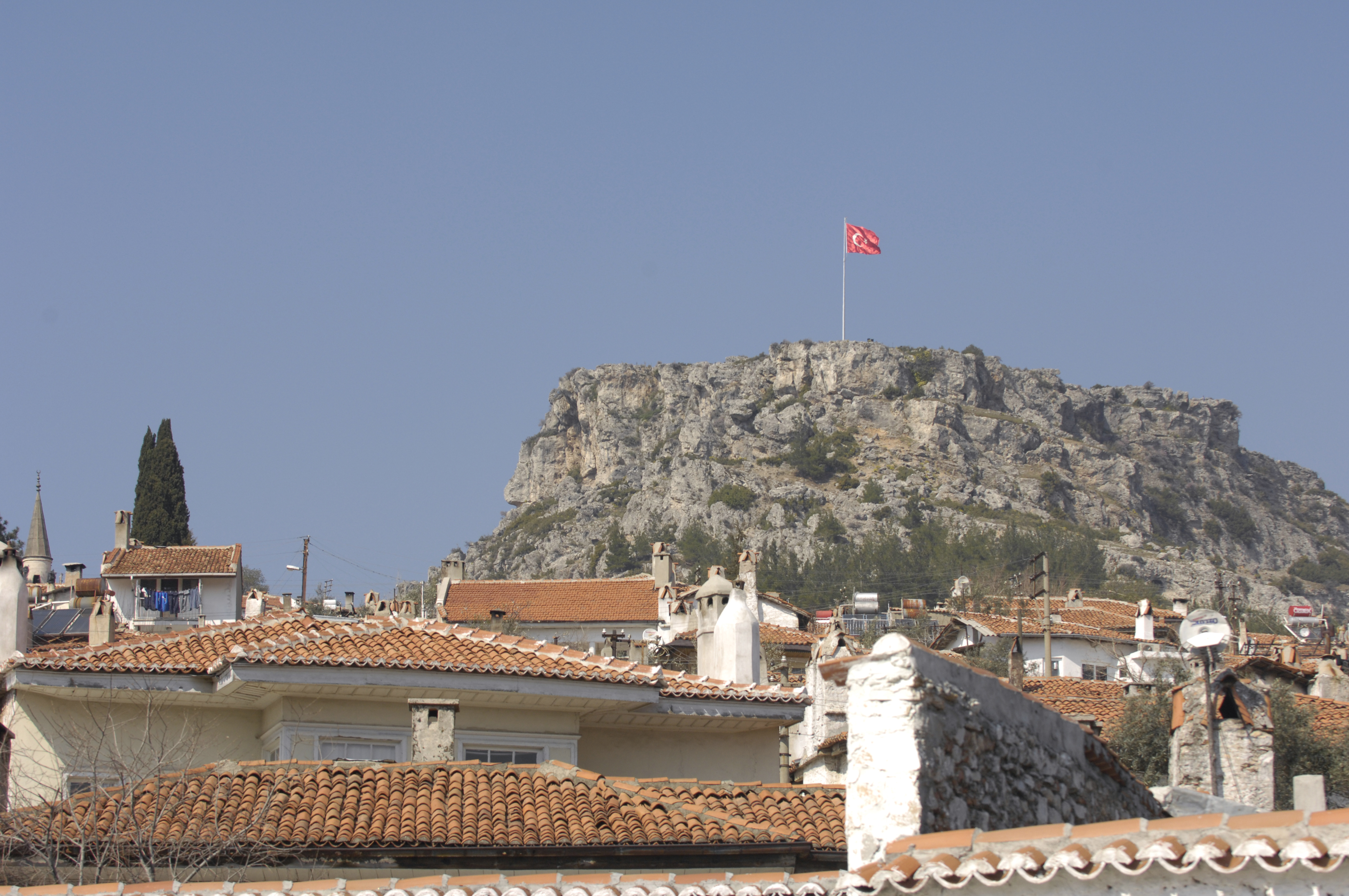
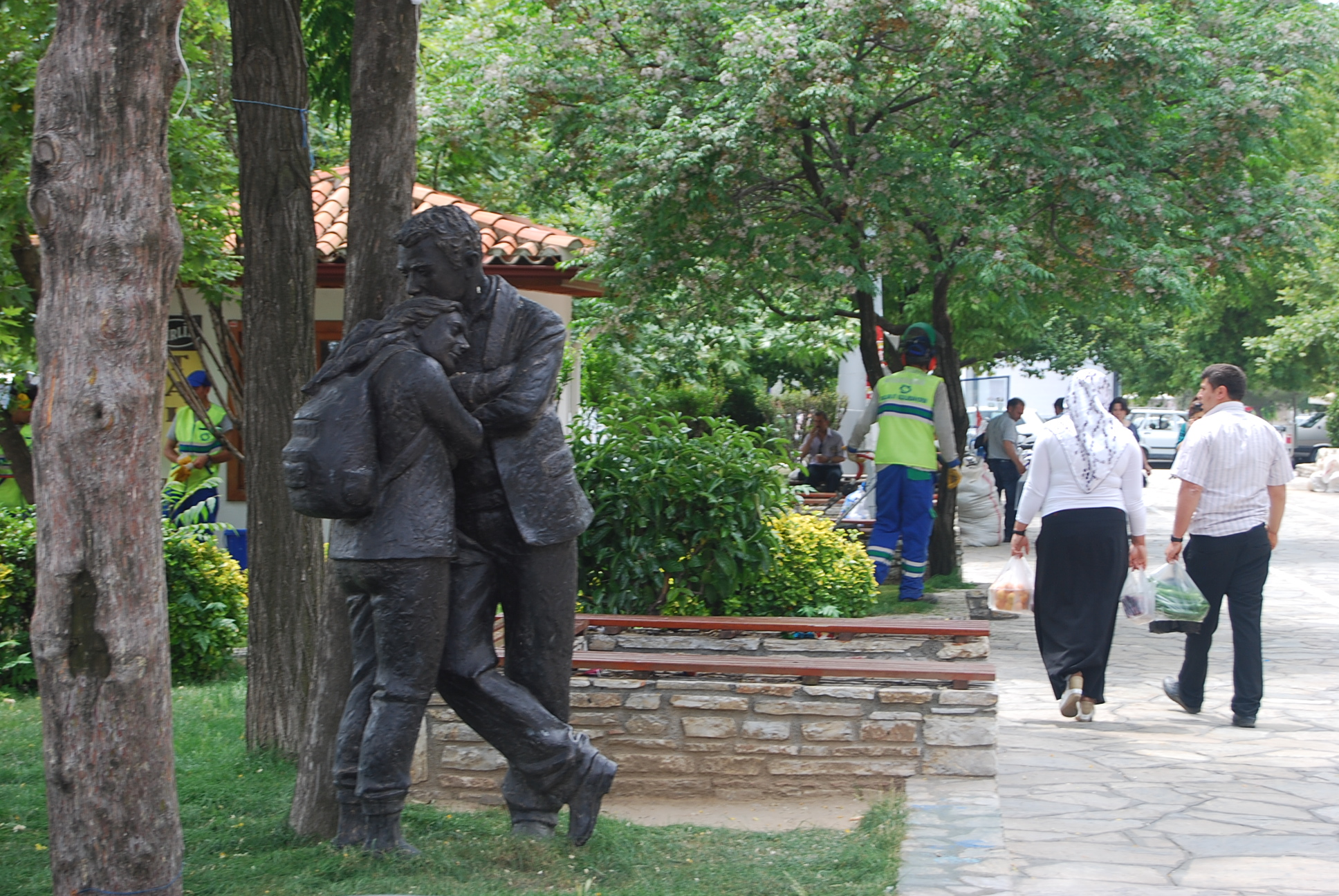
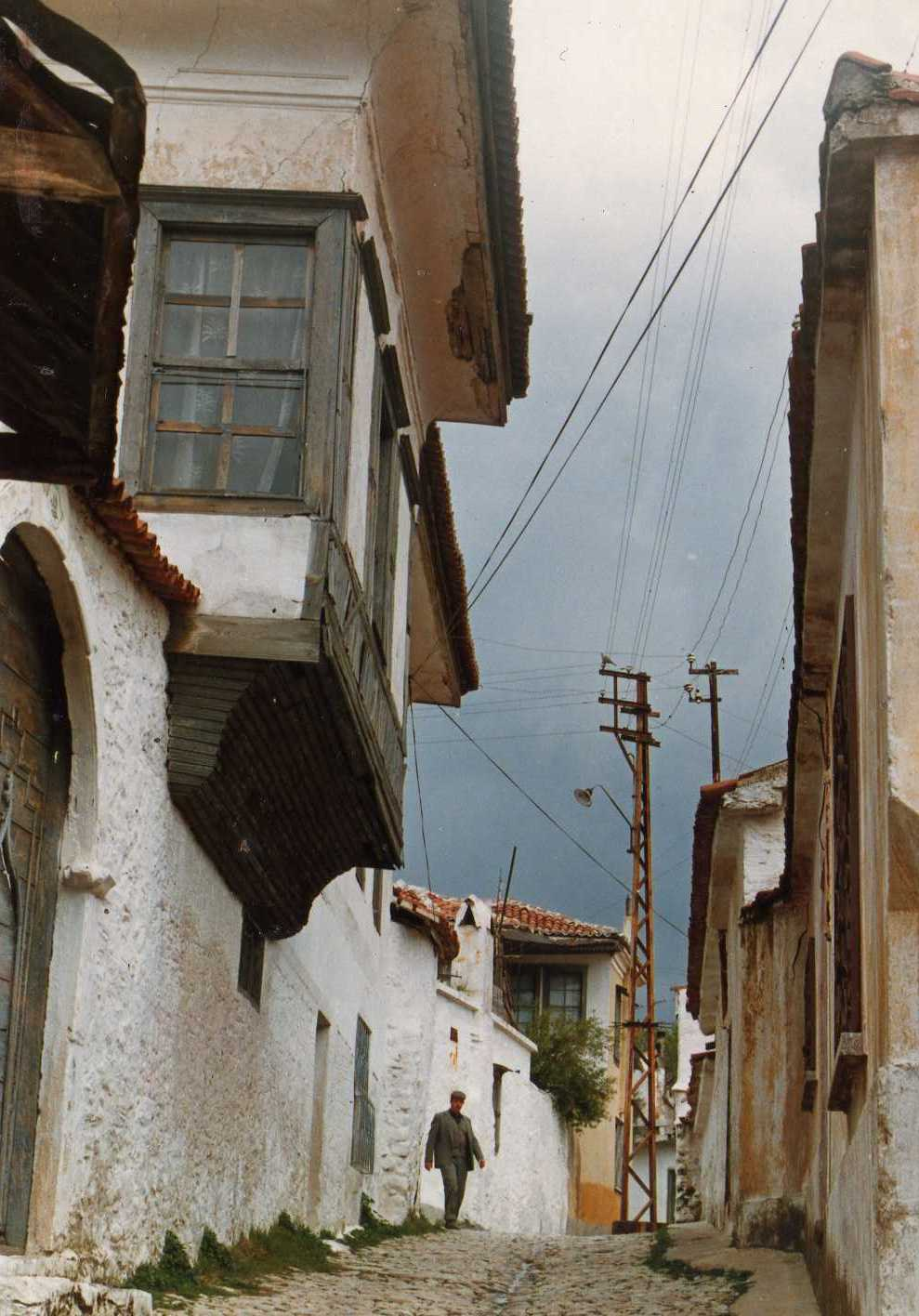
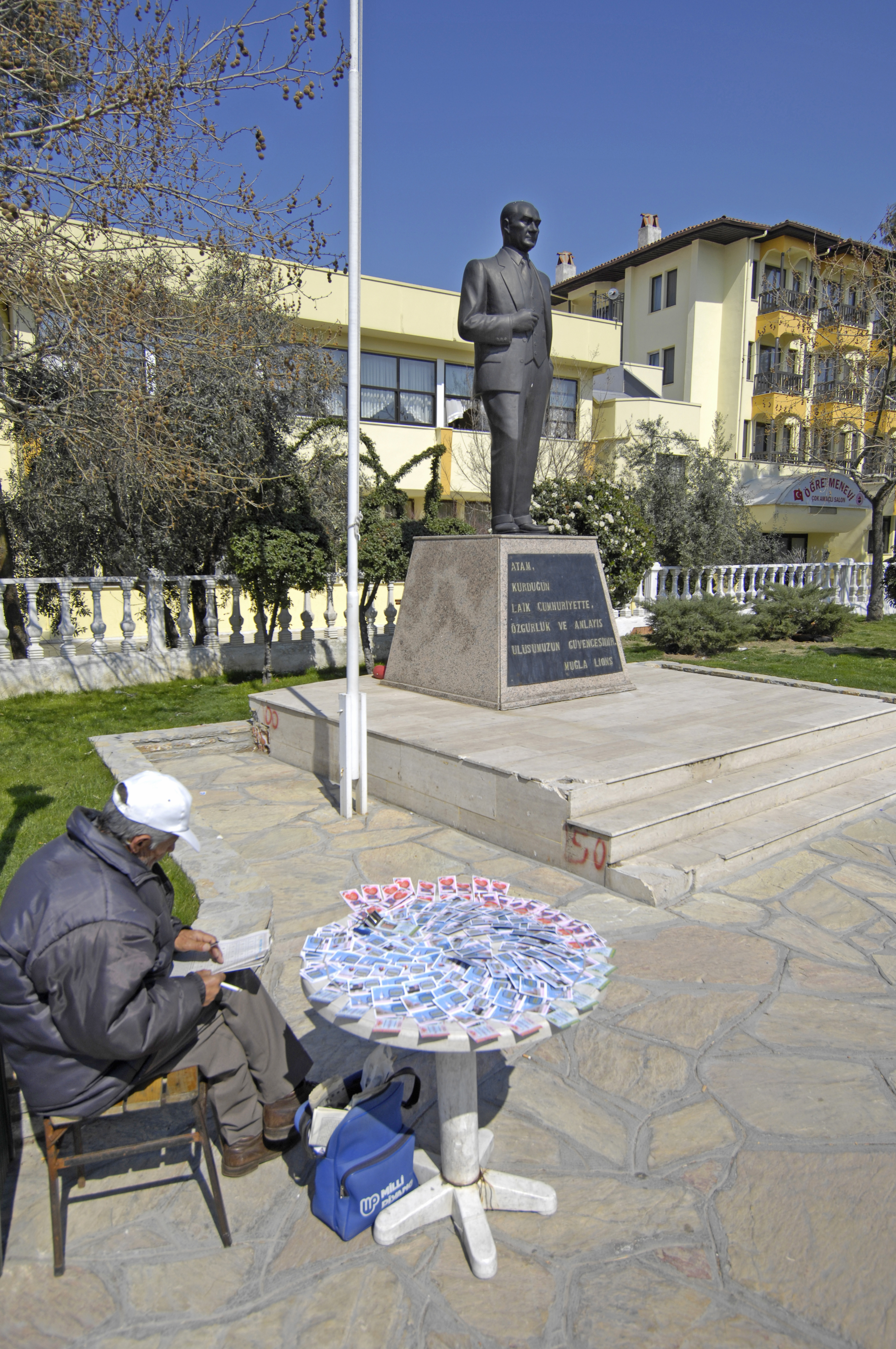
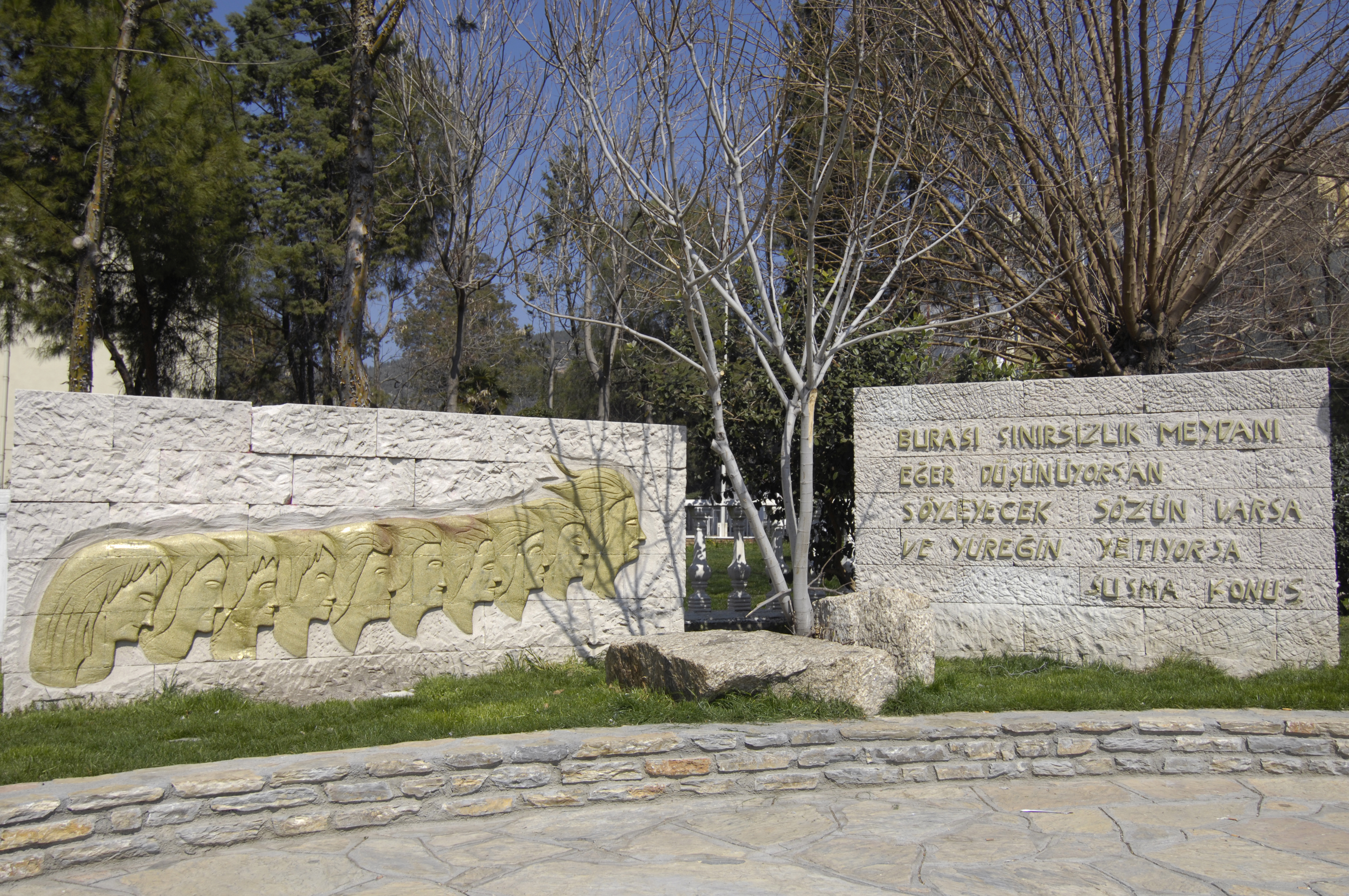
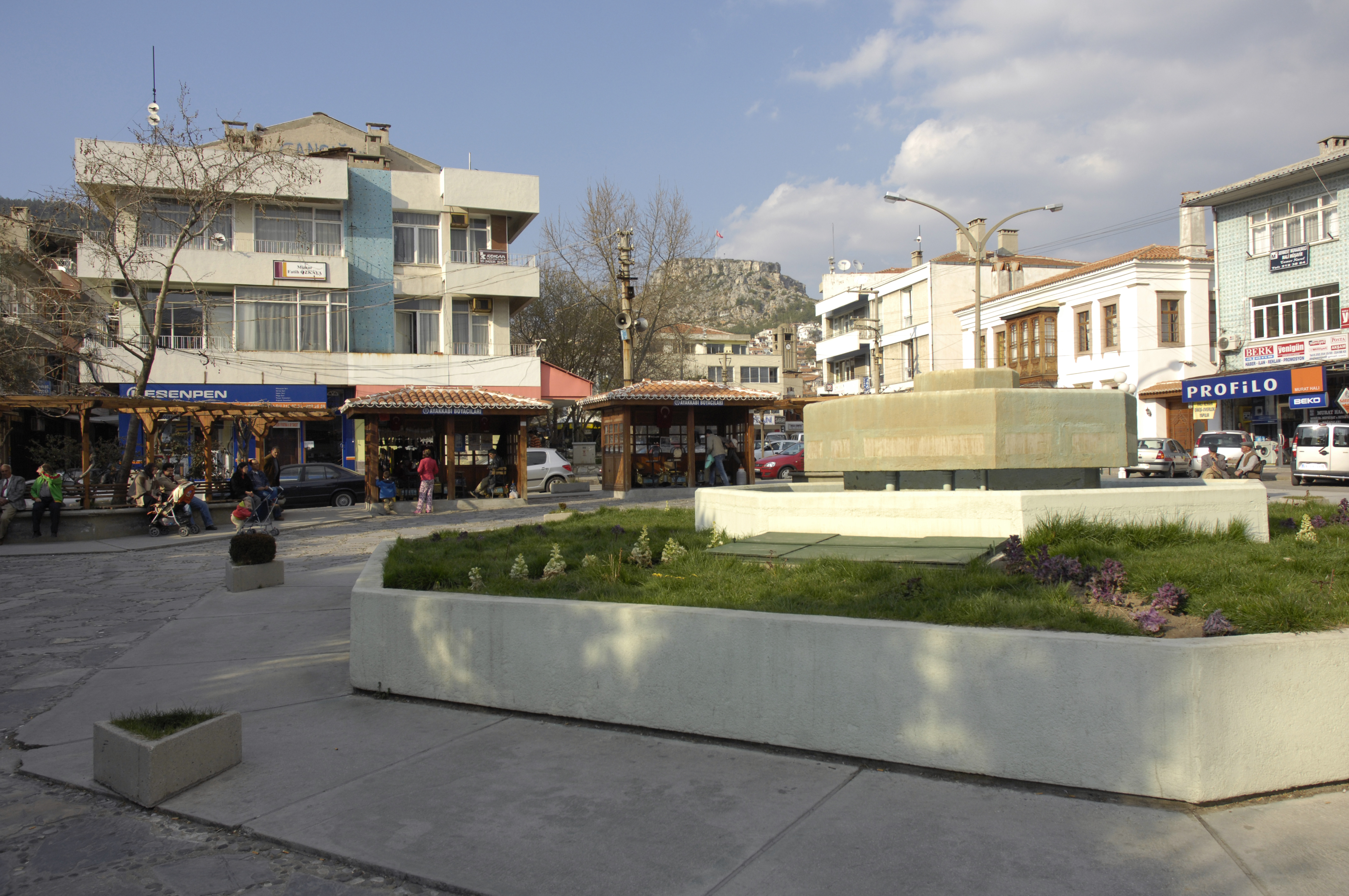

- Emblem of Muğla Metropolitan Municipality

- Location of Menteşe district within Muğla Province.

- Location of Muğla within Turkey. Muğla (Europe)
- Coordinates: 37°13′N 28°22′E
- Country: Turkey
- Region: Aegean
- Province: Muğla
- Established: In 2nd century BCE under the indigenous name of Mobolla during its passage from a Carian federation linked with Taba (Tavas) to Rhodian domination.

Government
  - Metro: Ahmet Aras (CHP)
- Elevation: 660 m (2,170 ft)

Population (2022)
  - Total: 82,717
- Time zone: UTC+3 (TRT)
- Area code: (+90) 252
- Licence plate: 48
- Website: Muğla Metropolitan Municipality

Muğla (Turkish: [ˈmuːɫa]) is a city in southwestern Turkey. The city is the center of the district of Menteşe and Muğla Province, which stretches along Turkey's Aegean coast. Muğla's center is situated inland at an altitude of 660 m and lies at a distance of about 30 km (19 mi) from the nearest seacoast in the Gulf of Gökova to its south-west. Muğla (Menteşe) district area neighbors the district areas of Milas, Yatağan and Kavaklıdere to its north by north-west and those of Ula and Köyceğiz, all of whom are dependent districts. Muğla is the administrative capital of a province that incorporates internationally well-known and popular tourist resorts such as Bodrum, Marmaris, Datça, Dalyan, Fethiye, Ölüdeniz and also the smaller resort of Sarigerme.

== History ==
=== Classical period ===
Muğla was apparently a minor settlement in classical antiquity, a halfway-point along the passage between the Carian cities of Idrias (later Stratonicea) to the north and Idyma (modern Akyaka) to the southwest on the coast. There are almost no ruins to reveal the history of the settlement of Mobolla. On the high hill to the north of the city, a few ancient remains indicate that it was the site of an acropolis. A handful of inscriptions were unearthed within the city itself and they date back to the 2nd century BC. It appears in the historical record for the first time at the beginning of the 2nd century BC under the name Mobolla (Ancient Greek: Μόβωλλα, Móbōlla). At that time, the region was passing from what was apparently an eastern Carian federation linked with Taba (modern Tavas) and other cities to Rhodian domination. Mobolla was part of the Rhodian Peraea from at least 167 BC until the 2nd century AD. While the region was subject to Rhodes, it was not incorporated in the Rhodian state.

In 2018, archaeologists unearthed a 2,300 year-old rock sepulchre of an ancient Greek boxer named Diagoras of Rhodes, on a hill in the Turgut village, Muğla province, Marmaris. This unusual pyramid tomb was considered to belong to a holy person by the local people. The shrine, used as a pilgrimage by locals until the 1970s, also has the potential to be the only pyramid grave in Turkey. Excavation team also discovered an inscription with these words: “I will be vigilant at the very top so as to ensure that no coward can come and destroy this grave.”

In 2018, archaeological ruins and mosaics discovered in the city have been confirmed to belong to the villa of the Greek fisherman Phainos, who lived in the 2nd century AD. Phainos was the richest and the most famous fisherman of his time.

Under Roman and then Byzantine rule, the town's name gradually changed to Mogolla (Μογωλᾶ, Mogōlâ) and then Mugla (Μούγλα, Moúgla; Turkish: Muğla). The town was one of the earliest ones conquered by the Turks in western Anatolia, being taken in the 13th century. It was then organized under the Menteşe dynasty based at Milas. Muğla acquired regional importance after it replaced Milas as the seat of the subprovince (sanjak) under the Ottoman Empire in 1420. From 1867 until 1922, Muğla was part of Aidin Vilayet. The sanjak kept the name Menteşe until the Republican Era, when it was renamed Muğla after its seat of government.

== Geography ==
The district area's physical features are determined by several pot-shaped high plains, delimited by mountains, of which the largest is the one where the city of Muğla is located and which is called under the same name (Muğla Plain). It is surrounded by steep slopes denuded of soil, paved with calcerous geology, and a scrub cover which gives the immediate vicinity of Muğla a barren appearance uncharacteristic of its region. Arable land is limited to valley floors.

== Economy ==
Its former profile as a predominantly rural, difficult to access, isolated and underpopulated region enclosed by a rugged mountainous complex is now coming to an end. Also in recent years, a major program of restoration of the city's architectural heritage has enhanced local tourism. The city remains an orderly, compact, and provincial agricultural center. The city retains its old neighborhoods, not having succumbed to the mid-20th century boom in concrete reconstruction. It had Turkey's first female provincial governor in the 1990s, Lale Aytaman. Nevertheless, Muğla still lacks sizeable manufacturing and processing centers, and its economy relies on trade, crafts, services, tourism, and agriculture. Tourism in Muğla provides employment for the local community, and its fertile soil and amenable climate provide a variety of products for people working in the agricultural sector.

== Climate ==
Muğla has a Mediterranean climate (Köppen: Csa) or a dry-summer humid subtropical climate (Trewartha: 'wet' Cs or Cf). It is characterised by long, hot, dry summers and cool, wet winters.

Highest recorded temperature:42.1 °C (107.8 °F) on 27 July 2007
Lowest recorded temperature:−12.6 °C (9.3 °F) on 4 January 1942

Climate data for Muğla (1991–2020, extremes 1928–2023)
Month	Jan	Feb	Mar	Apr	May	Jun	Jul	Aug	Sep	Oct	Nov	Dec	Year
Record high °C (°F)	20.9 (69.6)	25.5 (77.9)	28.8 (83.8)	31.6 (88.9)	39.4 (102.9)	40.8 (105.4)	42.1 (107.8)	41.2 (106.2)	39.2 (102.6)	36.8 (98.2)	29.0 (84.2)	23.8 (74.8)	42.1 (107.8)
Mean daily maximum °C (°F)	10.4 (50.7)	11.6 (52.9)	15.1 (59.2)	19.4 (66.9)	25.1 (77.2)	30.6 (87.1)	34.5 (94.1)	34.6 (94.3)	30.0 (86.0)	23.8 (74.8)	17.2 (63.0)	11.8 (53.2)	22.0 (71.6)
Daily mean °C (°F)	5.4 (41.7)	6.2 (43.2)	9.0 (48.2)	12.8 (55.0)	18.0 (64.4)	23.4 (74.1)	27.0 (80.6)	27.0 (80.6)	22.2 (72.0)	16.5 (61.7)	10.6 (51.1)	6.7 (44.1)	15.4 (59.7)
Mean daily minimum °C (°F)	1.6 (34.9)	2.1 (35.8)	3.9 (39.0)	7.1 (44.8)	11.6 (52.9)	16.7 (62.1)	20.4 (68.7)	20.5 (68.9)	15.6 (60.1)	10.6 (51.1)	5.7 (42.3)	3.0 (37.4)	9.9 (49.8)
Record low °C (°F)	−12.6 (9.3)	−9.9 (14.2)	−8.5 (16.7)	−3.6 (25.5)	1.0 (33.8)	6.7 (44.1)	10.5 (50.9)	9.0 (48.2)	5.6 (42.1)	0.1 (32.2)	−7.0 (19.4)	−9.0 (15.8)	−12.6 (9.3)
Average precipitation mm (inches)	219.6 (8.65)	169.5 (6.67)	119.6 (4.71)	74.4 (2.93)	56.9 (2.24)	27.7 (1.09)	15.1 (0.59)	14.9 (0.59)	25.9 (1.02)	72.8 (2.87)	139.2 (5.48)	229.6 (9.04)	1,165.2 (45.87)
Average precipitation days	12.97	12.33	10.63	9.63	8.17	4.17	1.97	1.83	3.2	6.53	8.9	13.23	93.6
Average snowy days	1.3	1.1	0.6	0	0	0	0	0	0	0	0	0.3	3.3
Average relative humidity (%)	78.7	76.4	71.3	68	62.6	52.7	45.4	47.3	53.4	66	75.8	81.1	64.9
Mean monthly sunshine hours	93.0	101.7	161.2	201.0	241.8	276.0	310.0	303.8	252.0	179.8	108.0	77.5	2,305.8
Mean daily sunshine hours	3.0	3.6	5.2	6.7	7.8	9.2	10.0	9.8	8.4	5.8	3.6	2.5	6.3
Source 1: Turkish State Meteorological Service
Source 2: NOAA(humidity), Meteomanz(snow days 2000-2023)

== Demographics ==
Due to the particularity of its location, commanding a large part of Anatolia's southwestern coast and a number of busy district centers, Muğla is also notable by the large number of people who, short of being natives in the strict sense, had associations of one sort or another with the city, including among its small Greek minority until the 1923 Population exchange between Greece and Turkey. (Note: c. 1912 the Sanjak of Menteşe (Muğla) had a total population of 42,000, of which 1,500–4,000 were ethnic Greeks, according to varyious sources. Most Greeks residing in the subprovince lived in the city of Muğla, totalling slightly more than 1,000 in number.) Among these can be listed:

- Arms trading tycoon Basil Zaharoff, whose family were actually Greeks of the Ottoman capital but who was born in Muğla in 1849
- The French actress of Greek descent Anna Mouglalis, as attested by her name, can trace her roots to the city
- Mining and poultry magnate Yavuz Sıtkı Koçman (d. 2002) who contributed an important part of his fortune to building the university in the 1990s

== Places of interest ==
Although it is close to major resorts, Muğla has only recently begun to attract visitors. Sights of interest in the city include:

- Great Mosque of Muğla (Ulu Cami) – large mosque built in 1344 by the Beys of Menteşe
- Konakaltı Han and Yağcılar Han – restored 18th century caravanserais, the first used as an art gallery and facing Muğla Museum, and the second used for more commercial purposes
- Kurşunlu Cami – large mosque built in 1495
- Muğla City Museum has a good collection of archaeological and ethnographical artefacts, and 9 million year-old animal and plant fossils, recently discovered in nearby Kaklıcatepe
- the Ottoman Empire-era bazaar (Arasta) – marked by a clock tower built by a Greek craftsman named Filivari Usta in 1895
- Vakıflar Hamam – dating back to 1258, this bathhouse is still in use

The old quarter of Muğla – on the slopes and around Saburhane Square (Meydanı), consisting of about four hundred registered old houses dating from the 18th and 19th centuries, many of which are restored. These houses are mainly in the Turkish / Ottoman style, characterized by hayat ("courtyard") sections accessed through double-shuttered doors called kuzulu kapı ("lamb doors") and dotted with chimneys typical of Muğla. But there are also a number of "Greek" houses. The differences between the two types of houses may have as much to do with the extent to which wood or stone were used in their architecture, and whether they were arranged in introverted or extraverted styles, as with who inhabited them previously.

Local students tend to hang out in open air cafés along the İzmir highway, or in the caravanserai, or in Sanat Evi ("Art House") – an Ottoman-style residence that has been turned into a café / art gallery exhibiting principally wood carvings.

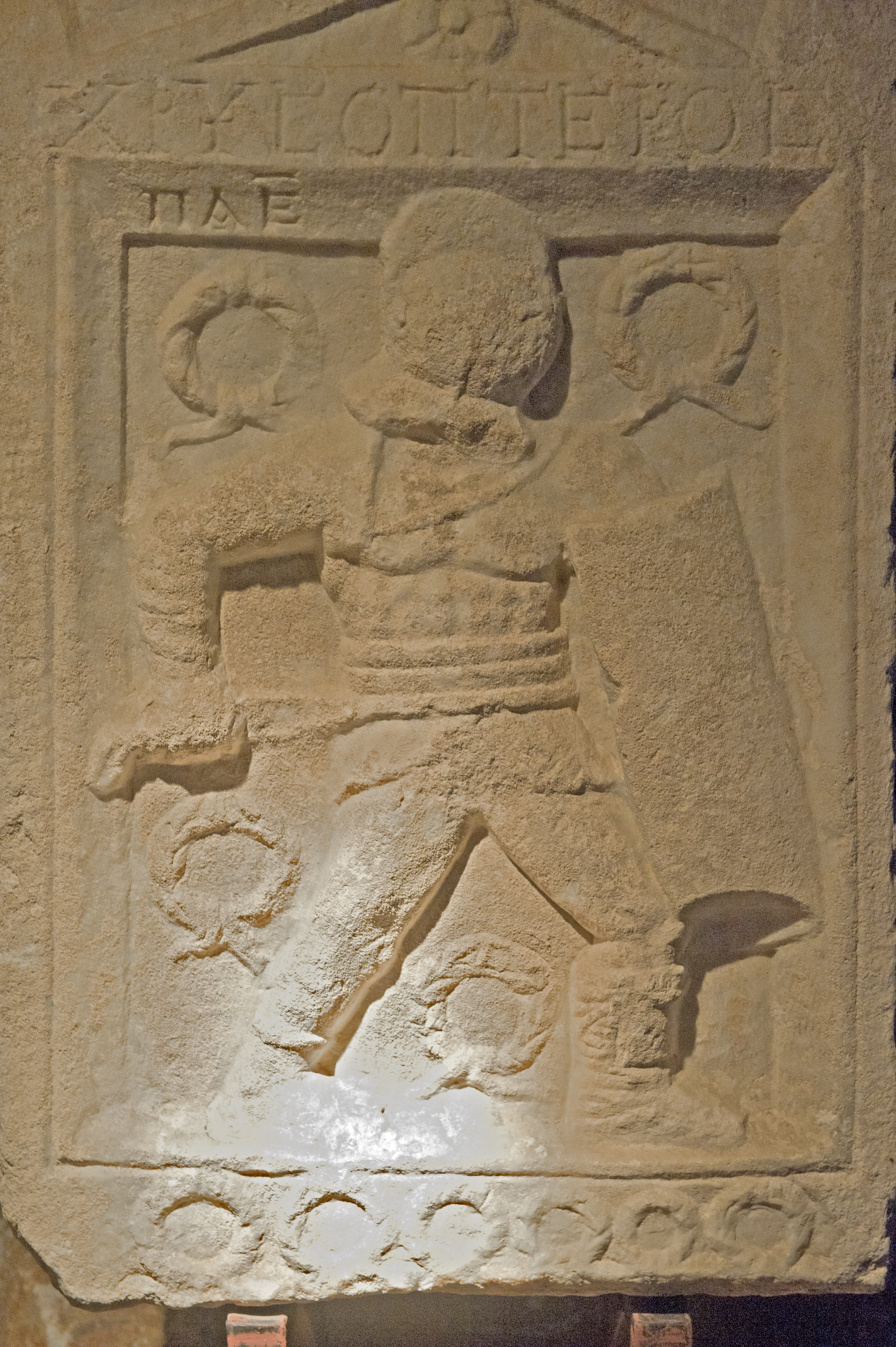
Muğla Museum Gladiator gravestone

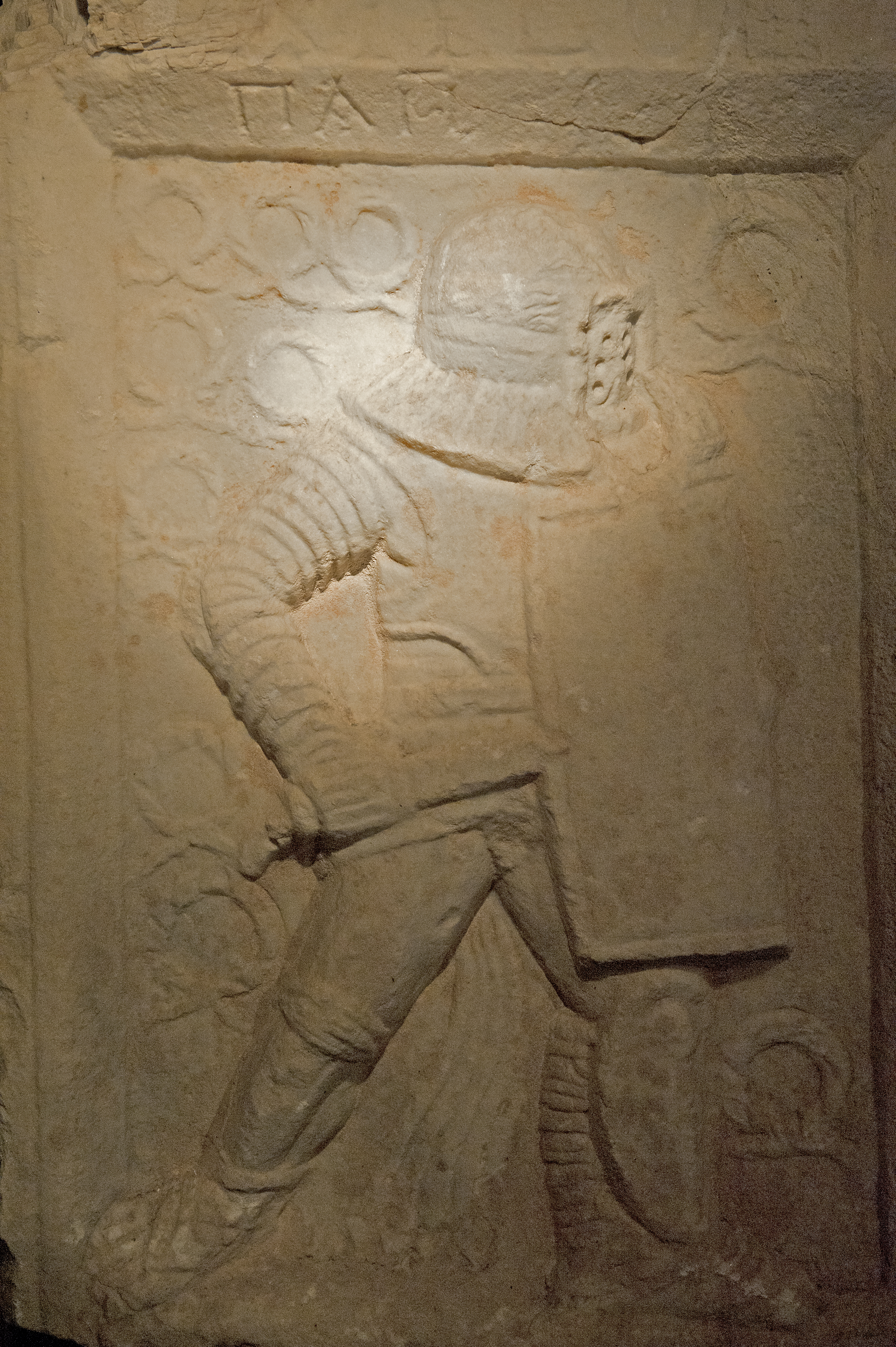
Muğla Museum Gladiator gravestone

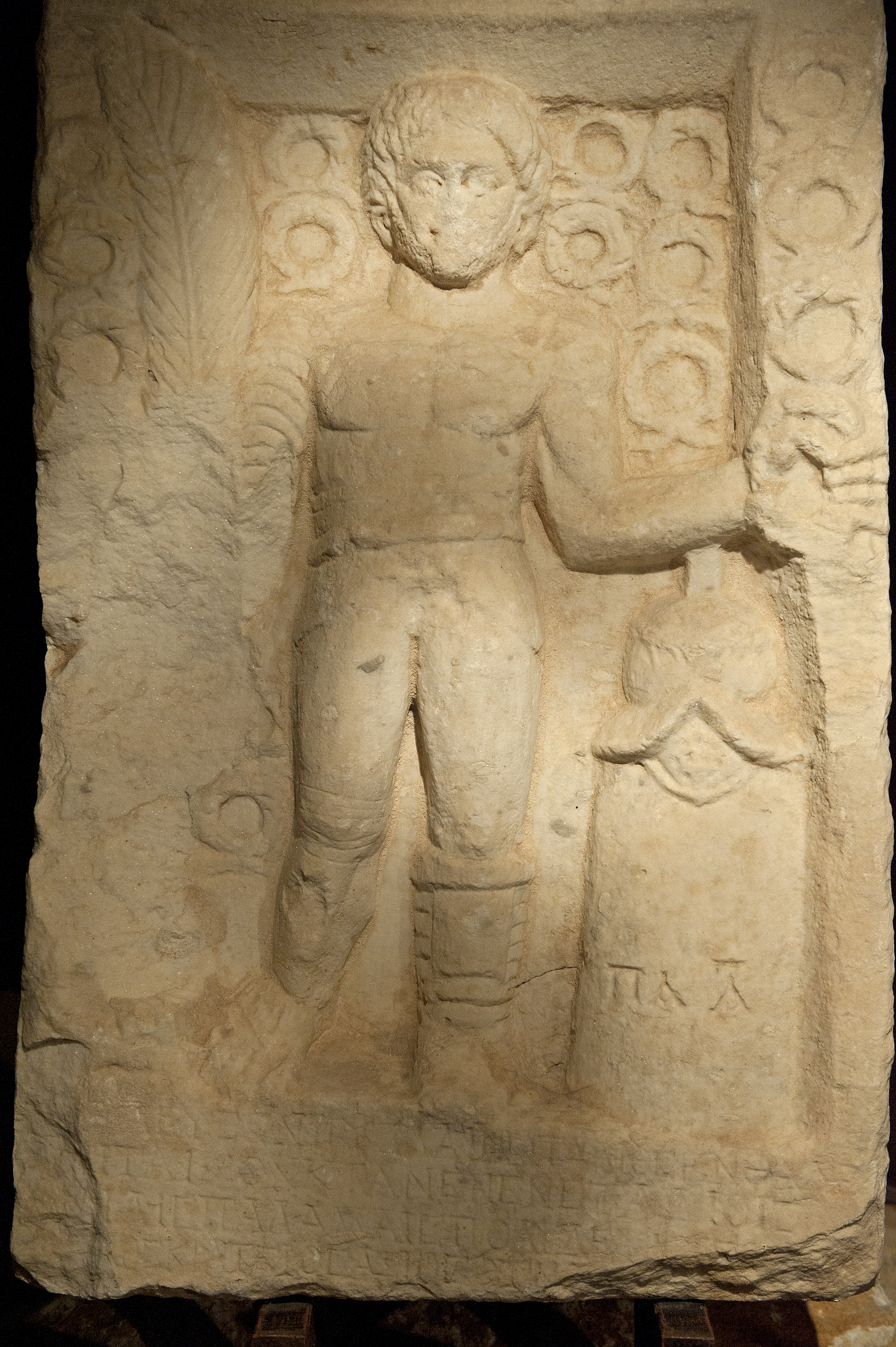
Muğla Museum Gladiator gravestone

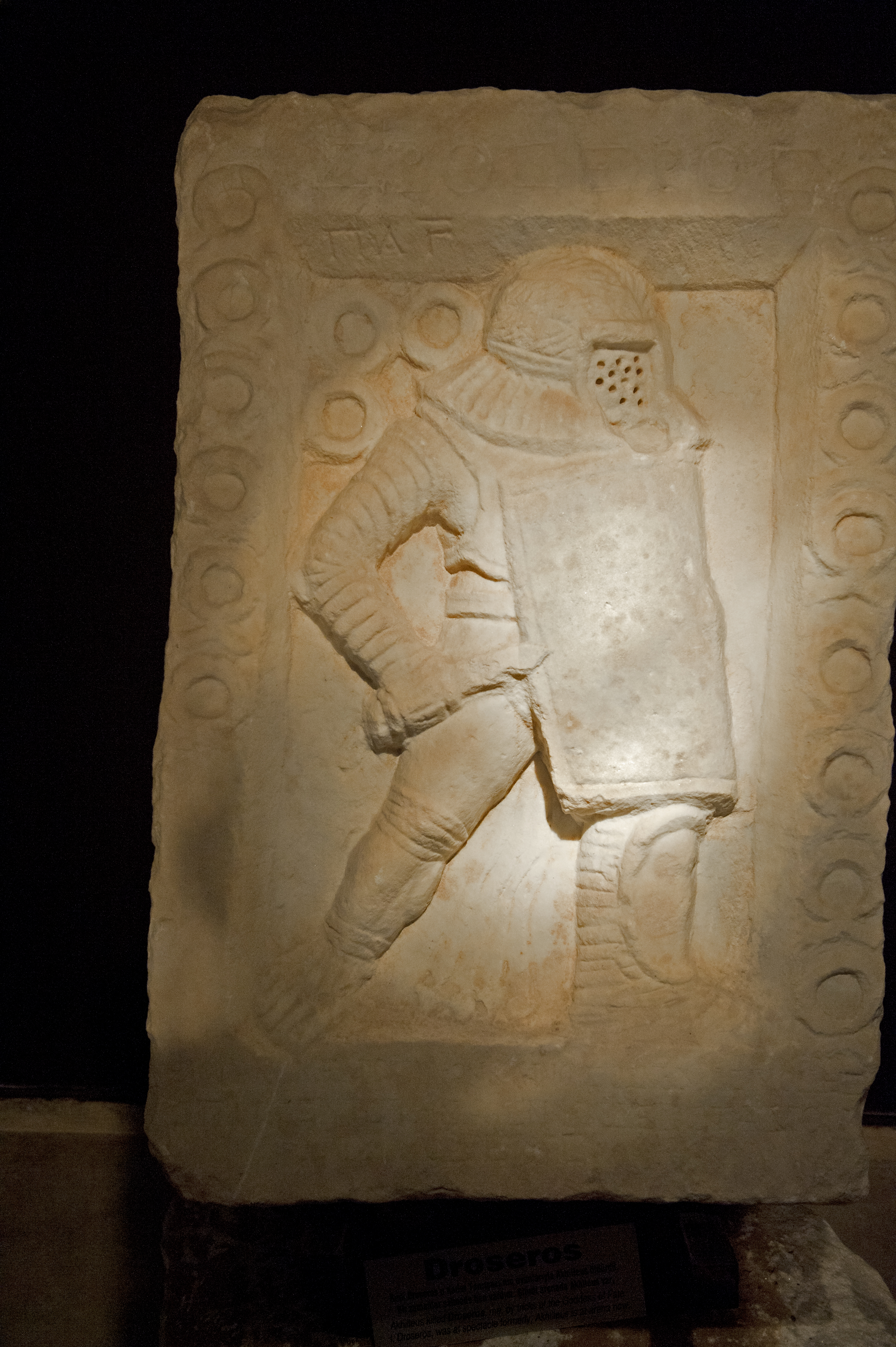
Muğla Museum Gladiator gravestone

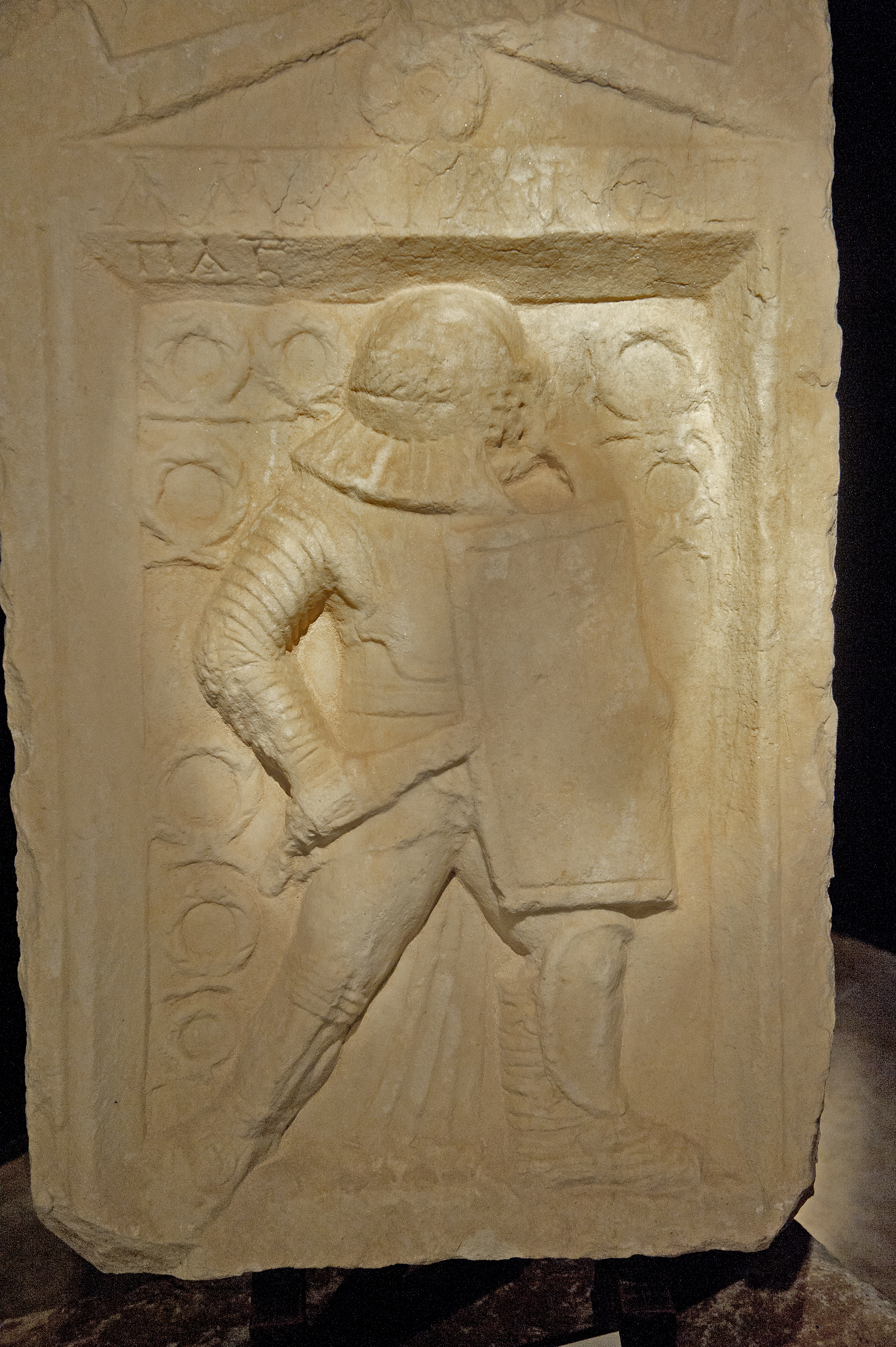
Muğla Museum Gladiator gravestone

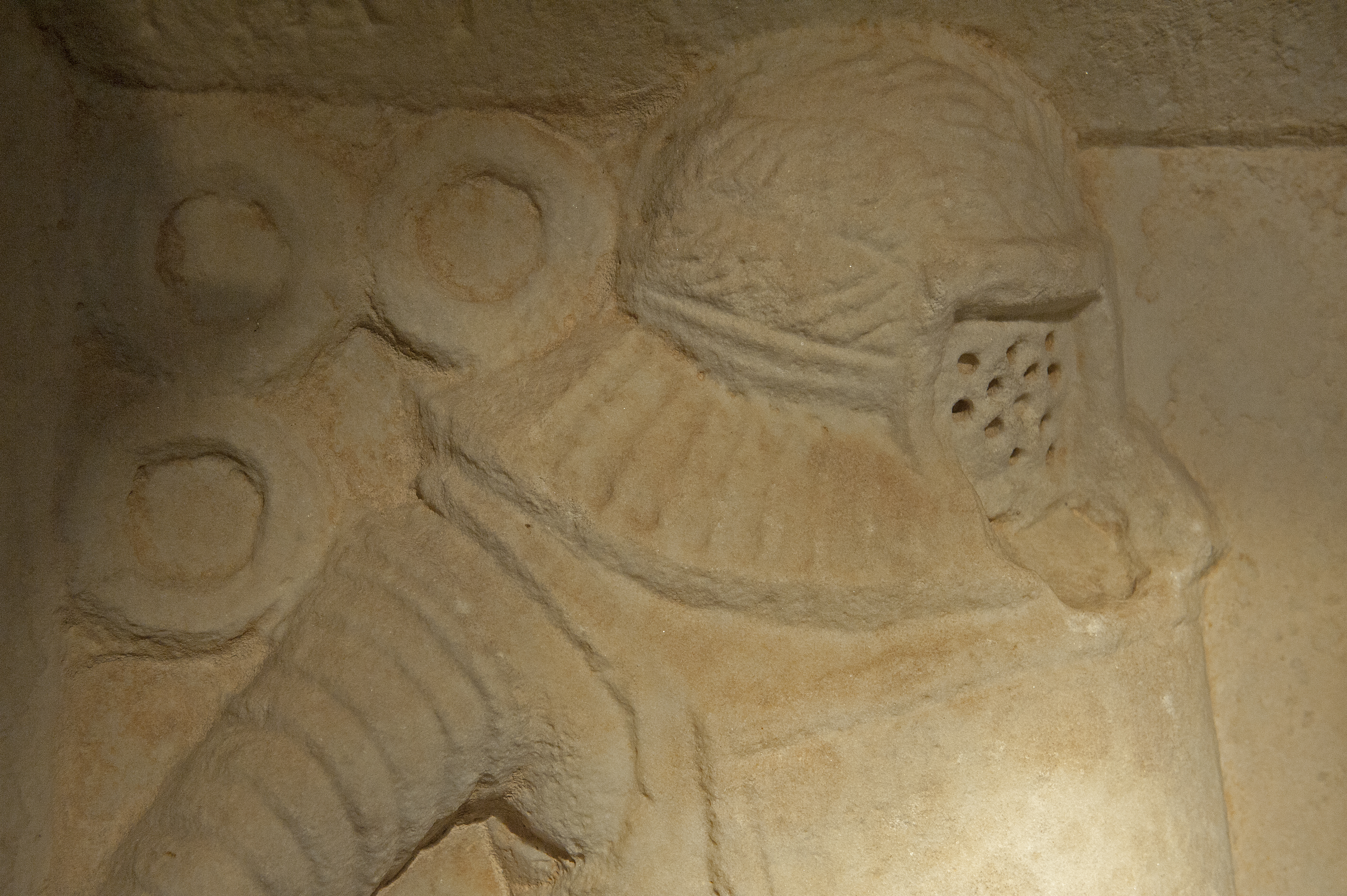
Muğla Museum Gladiator gravestone

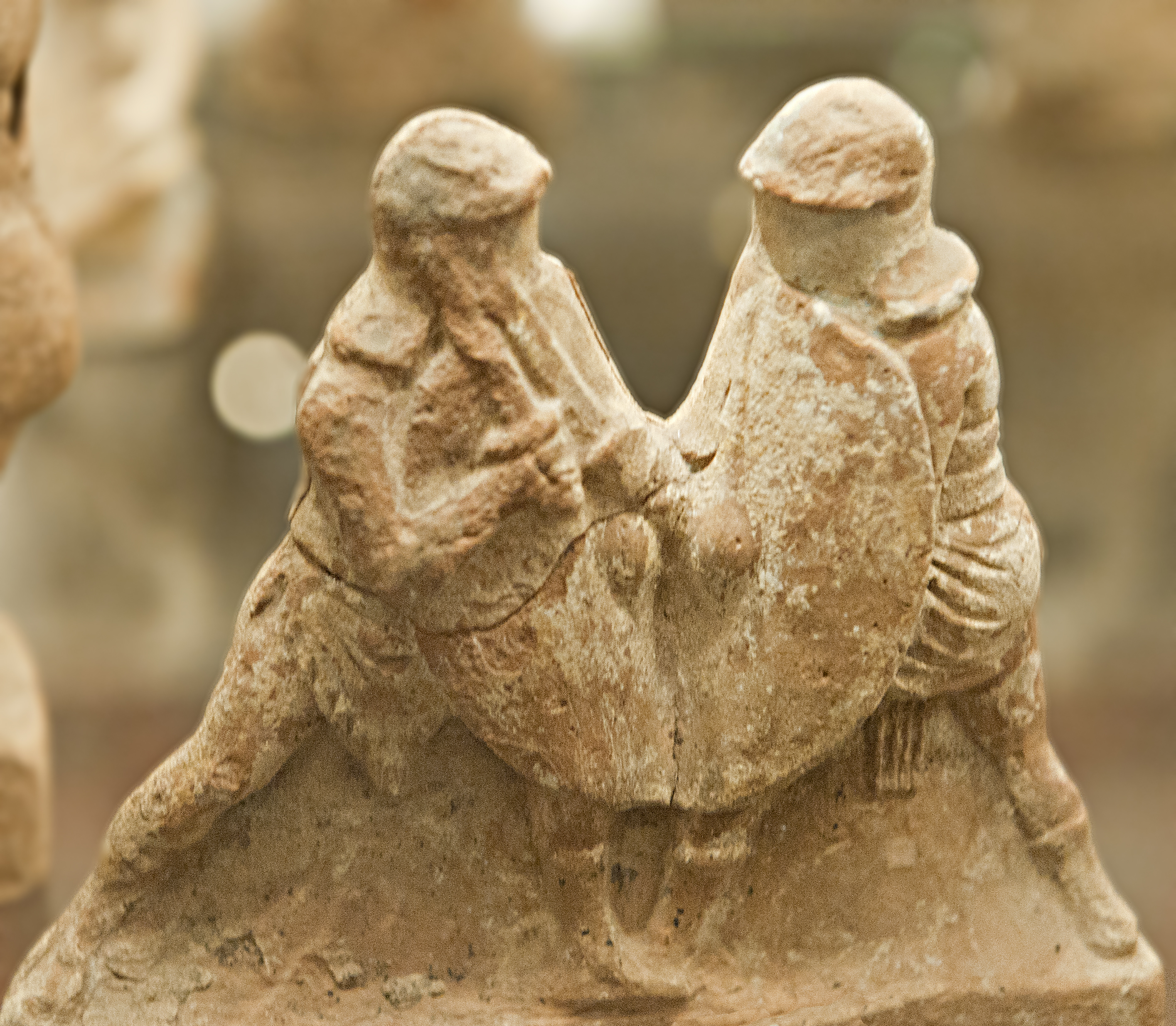
Muğla Museum Gladiators in small ceramic

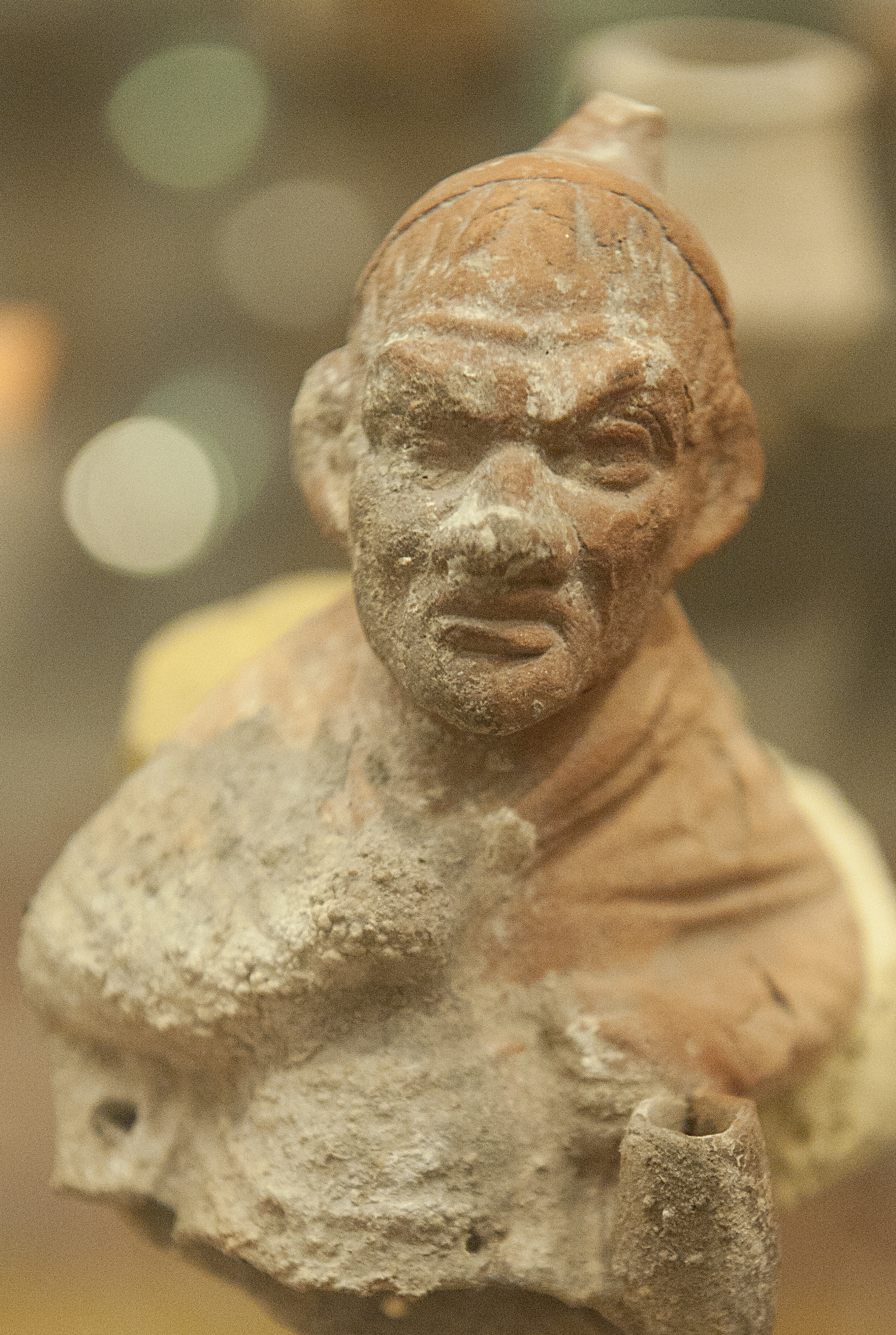
Muğla Museum Small ceramic

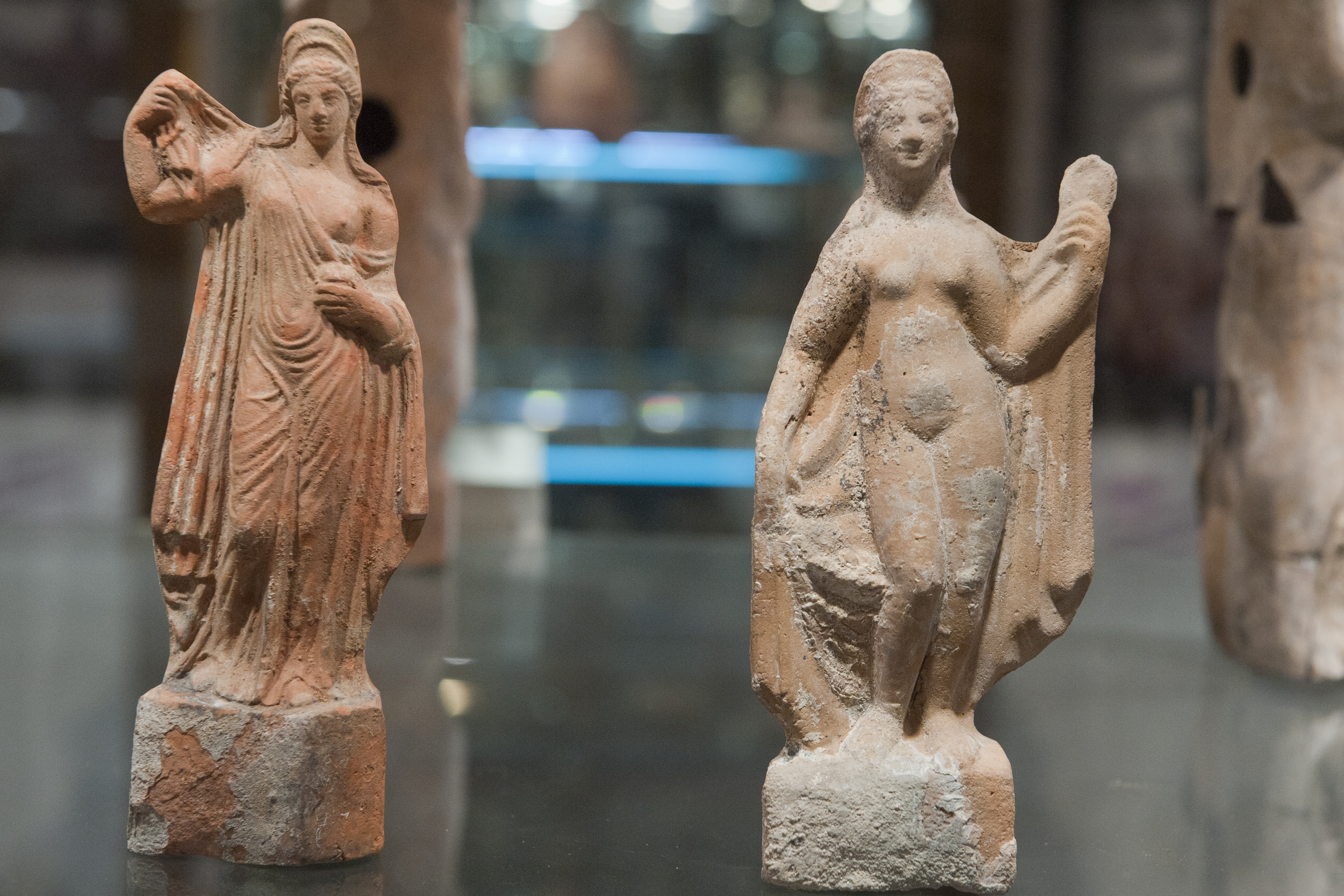
Muğla Museum Statuettes

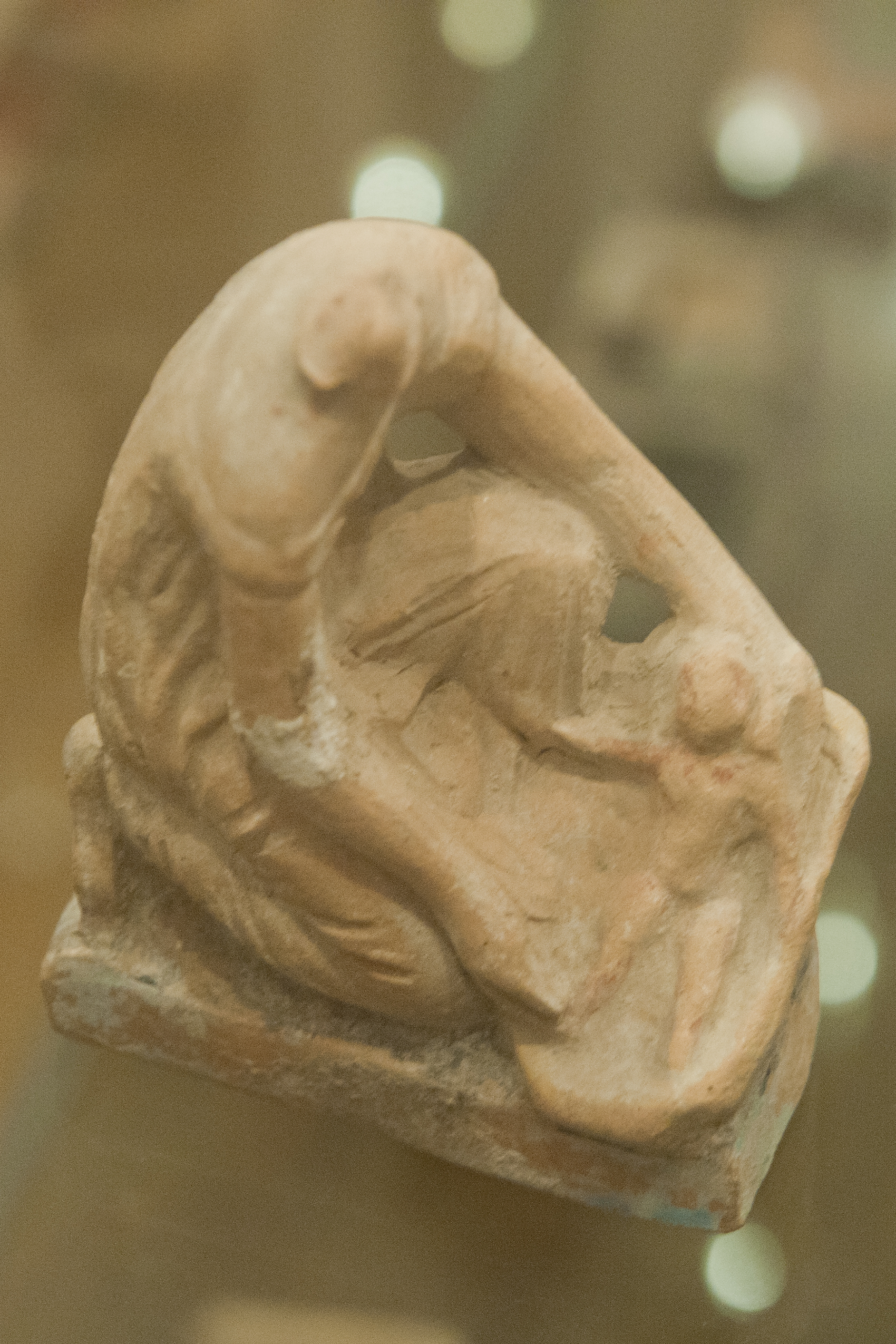
Muğla Museum Child bathing ceramic

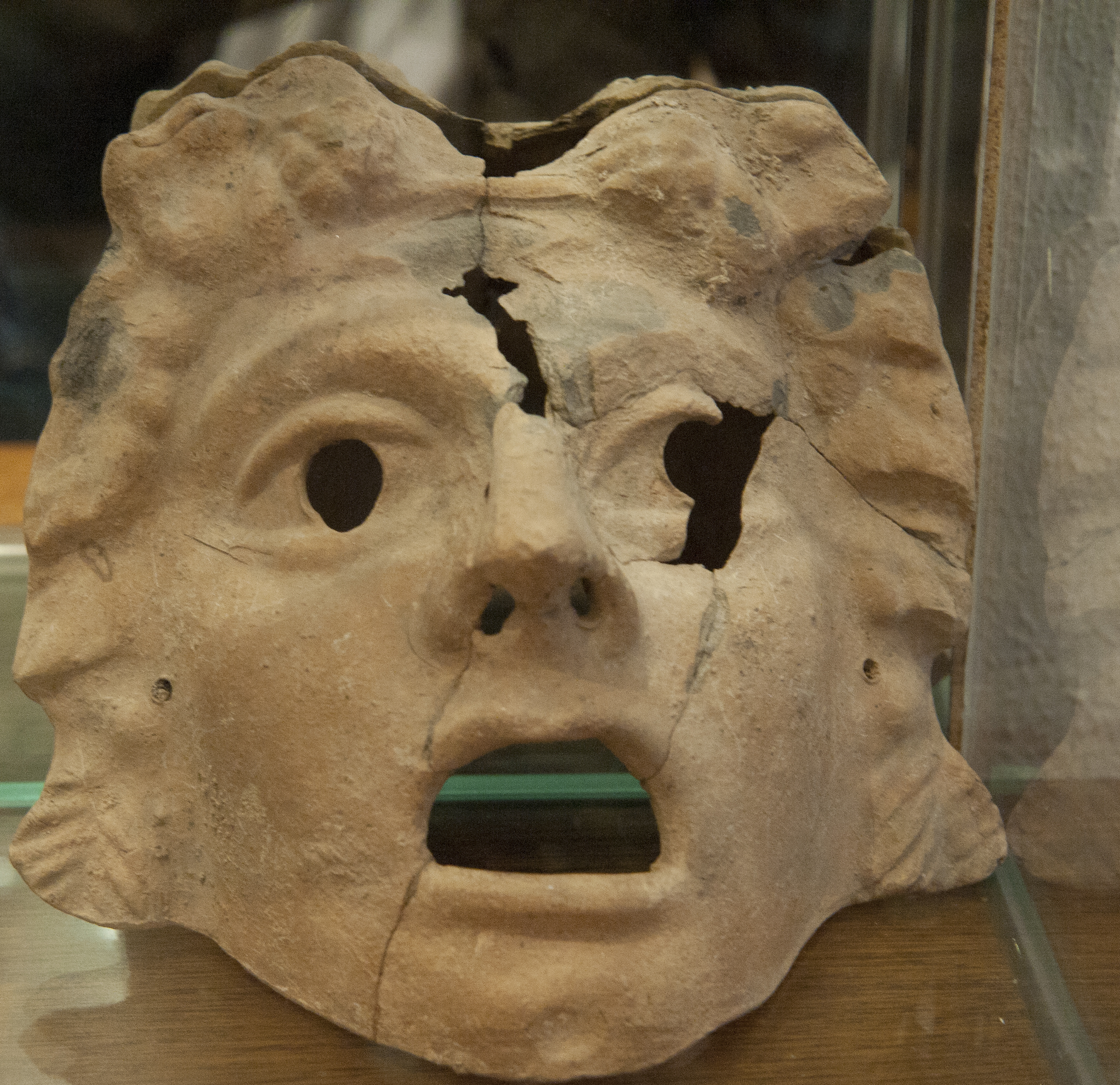
Muğla Museum Stage mask

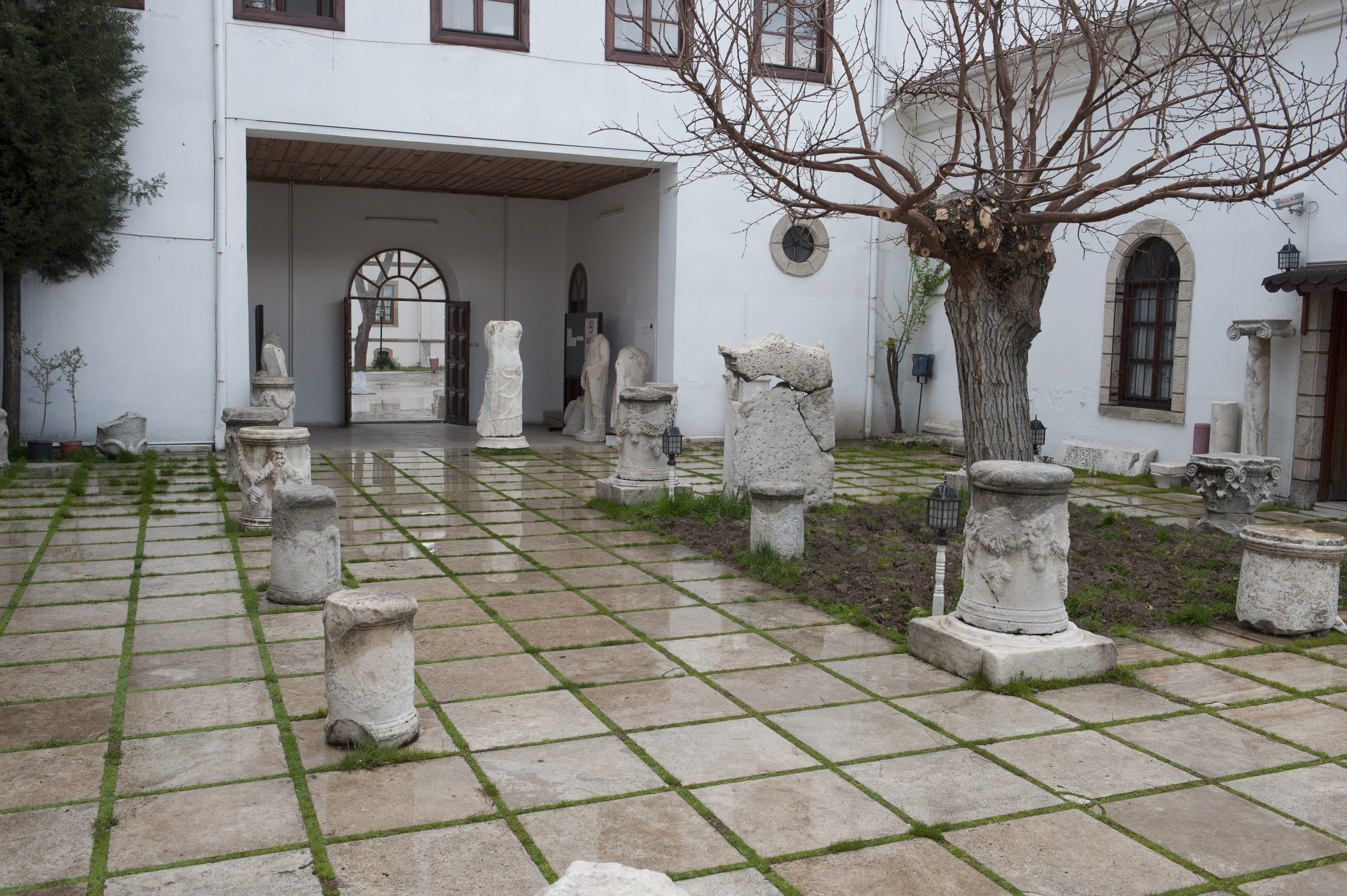
Muğla Museum Museum courtyard

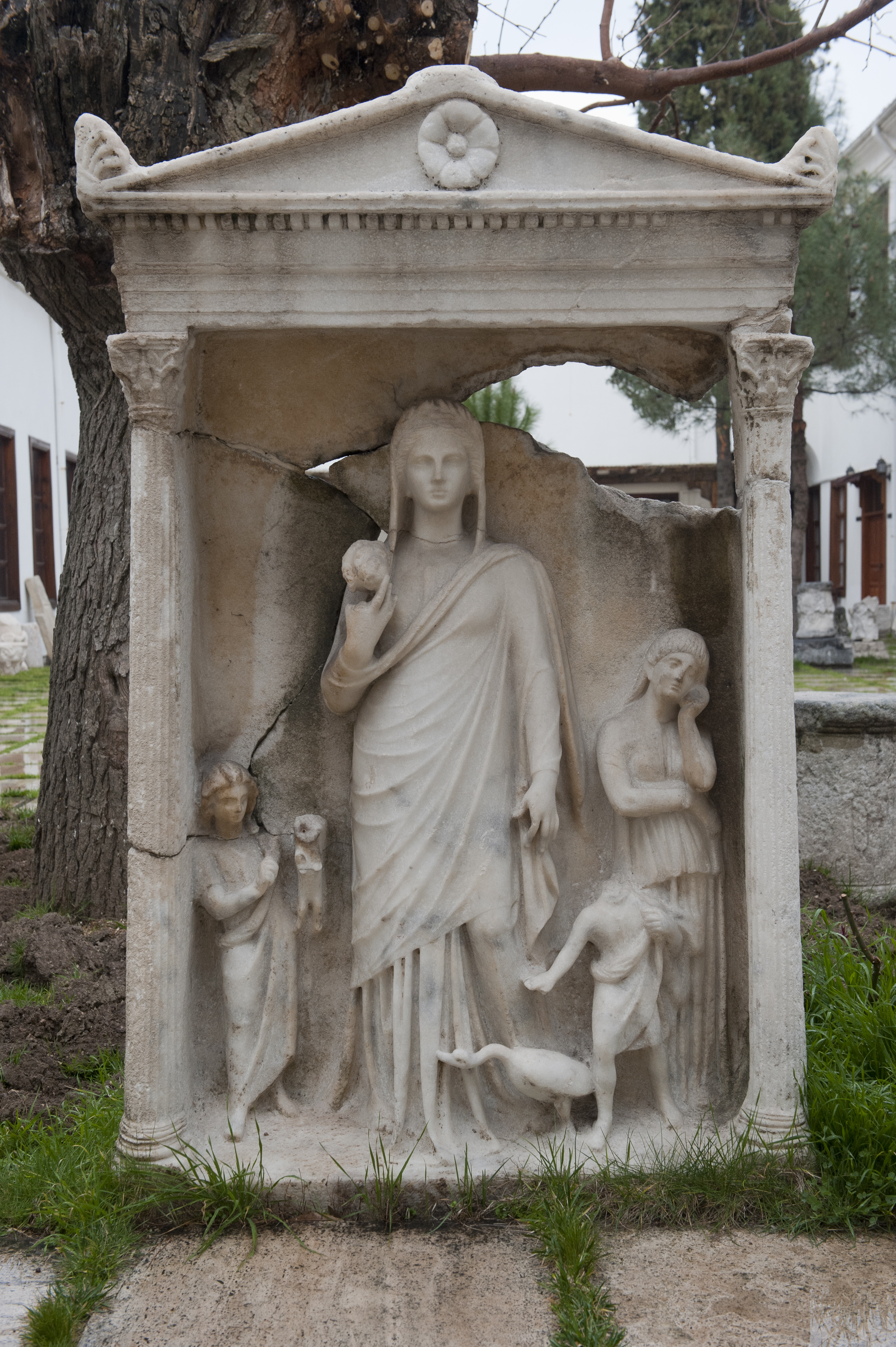
Muğla Museum Frieze

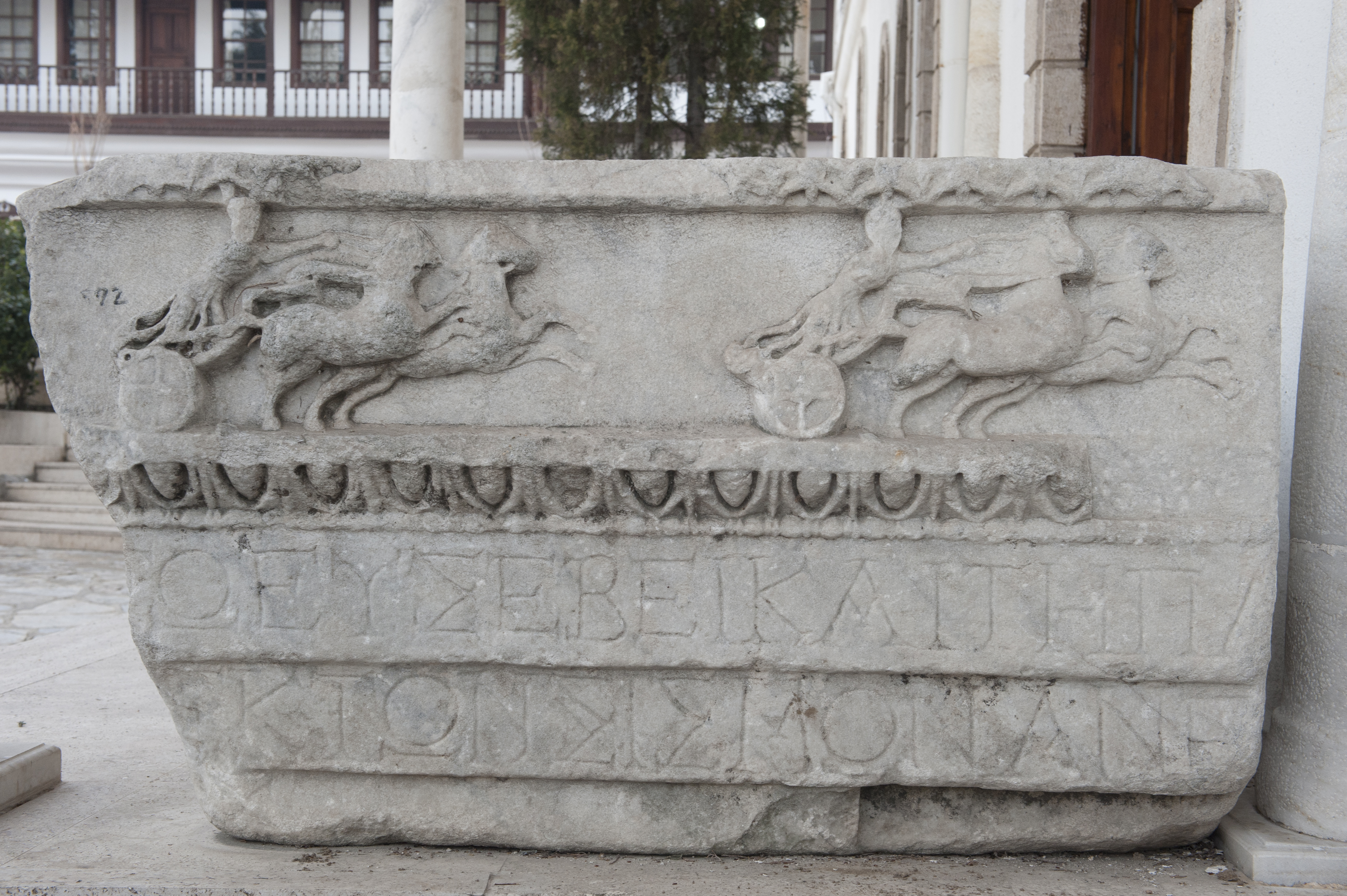
Muğla Museum Frieze

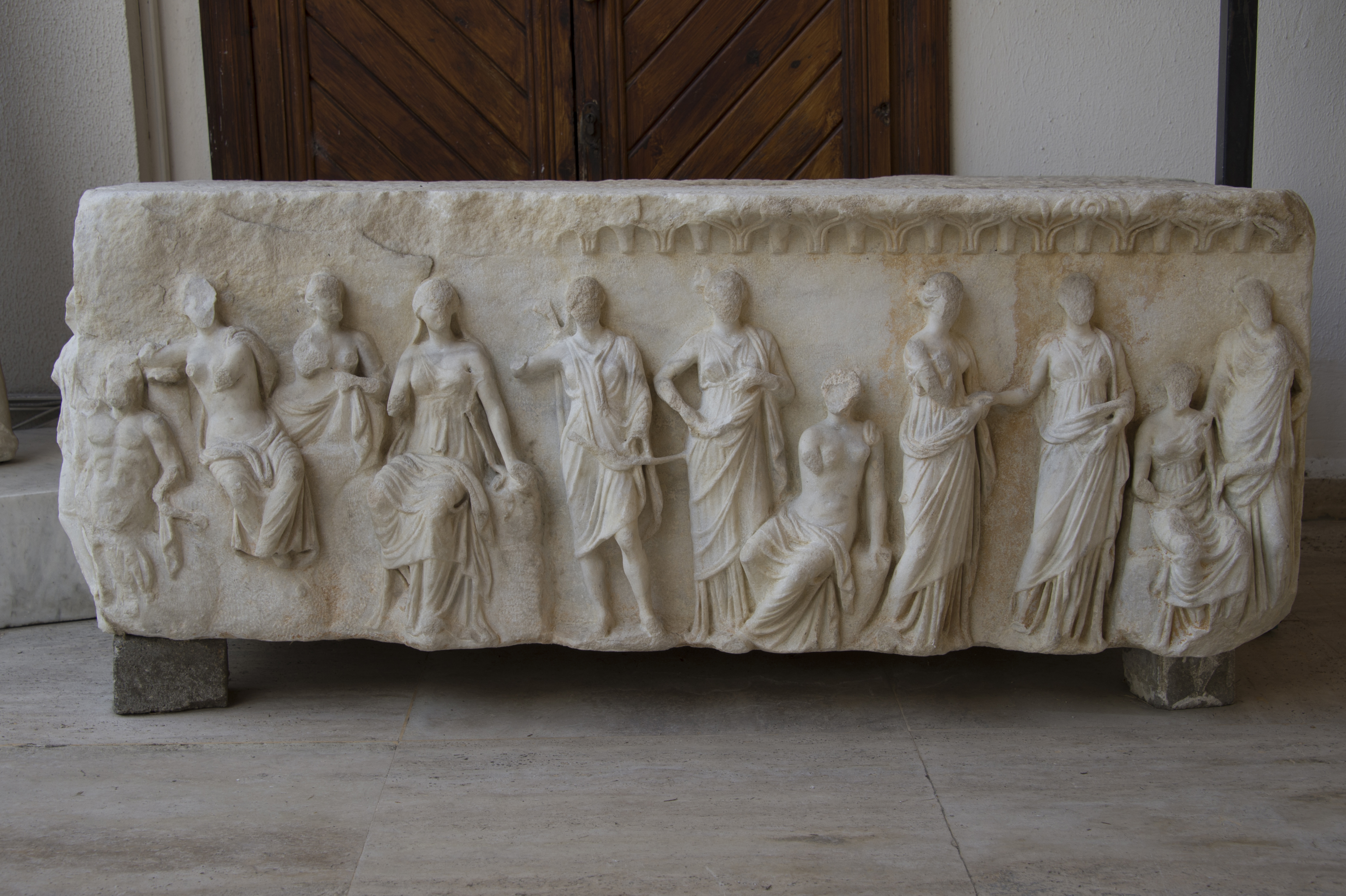
Muğla Museum Frieze

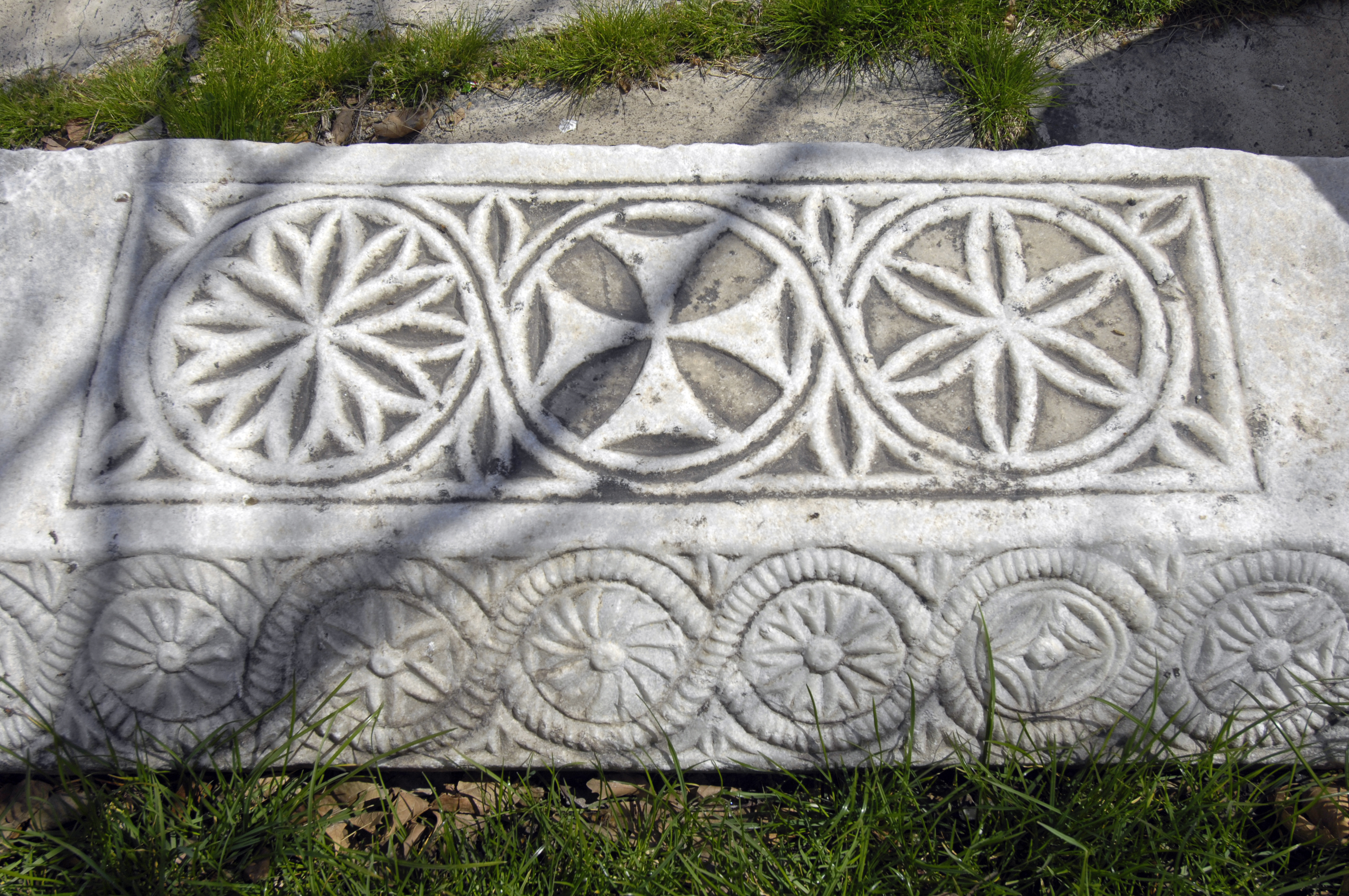
Muğla Museum Christian decoration

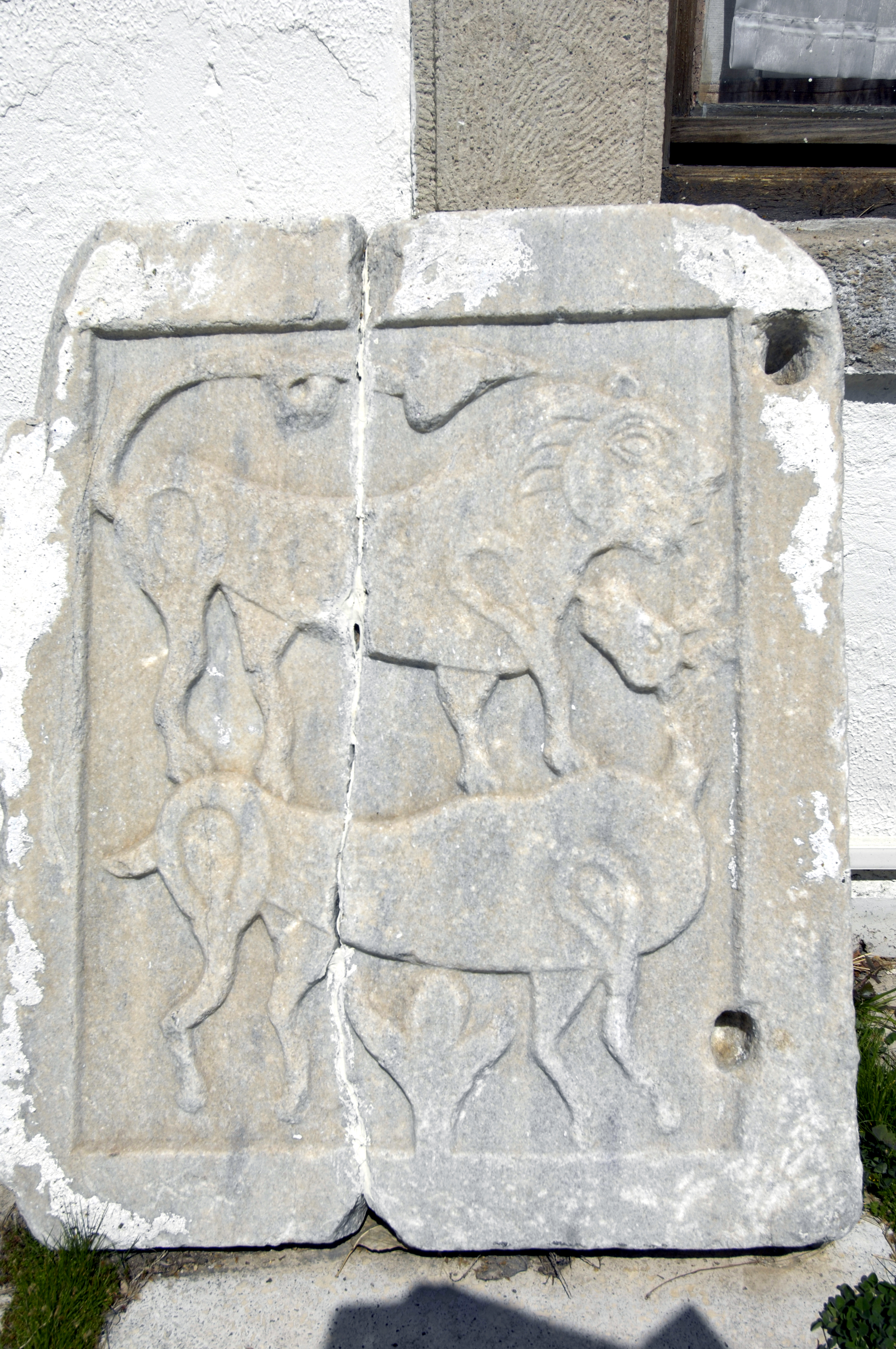
Muğla Museum Seljuk plaque

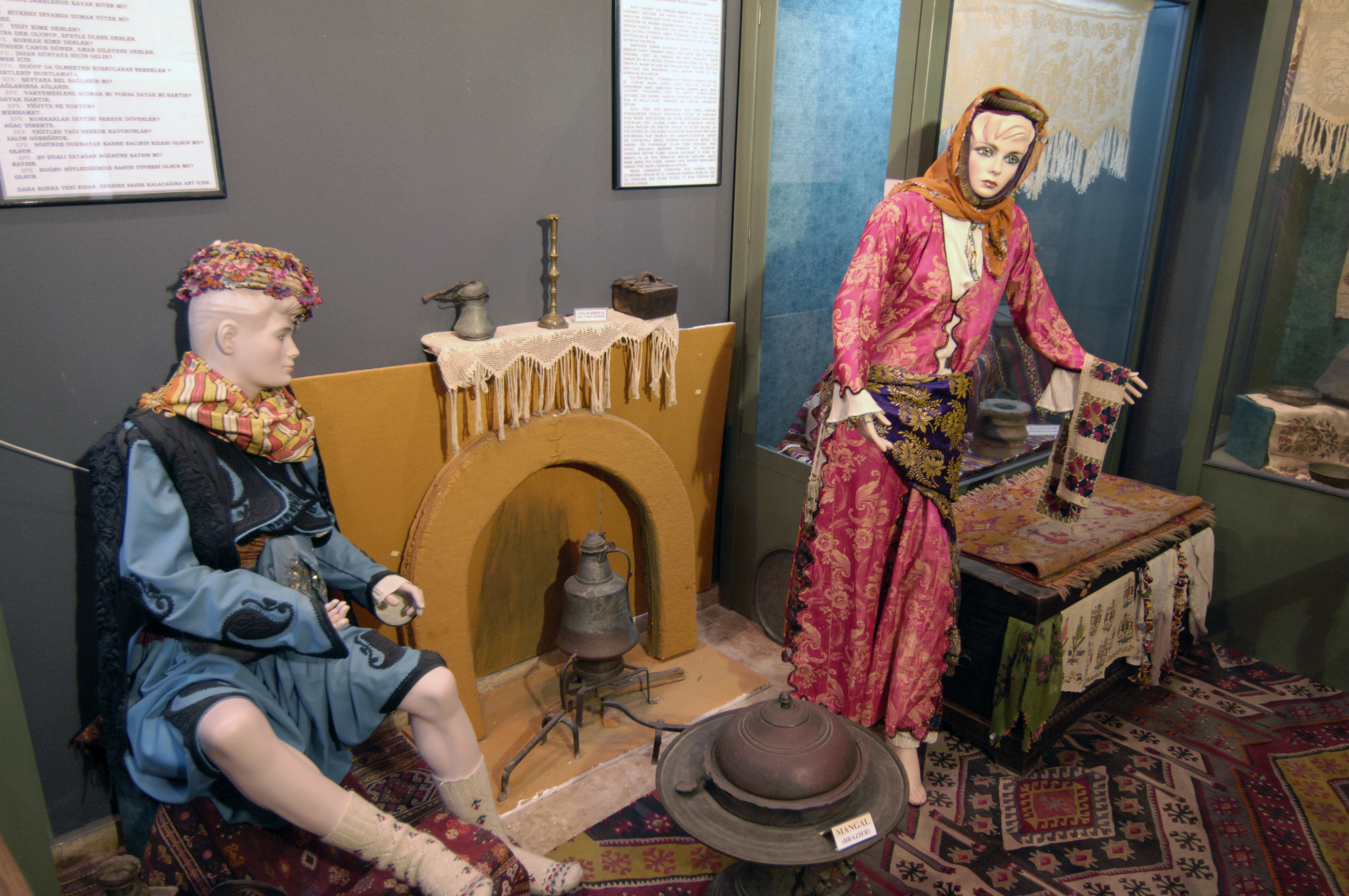
Muğla Museum Interior

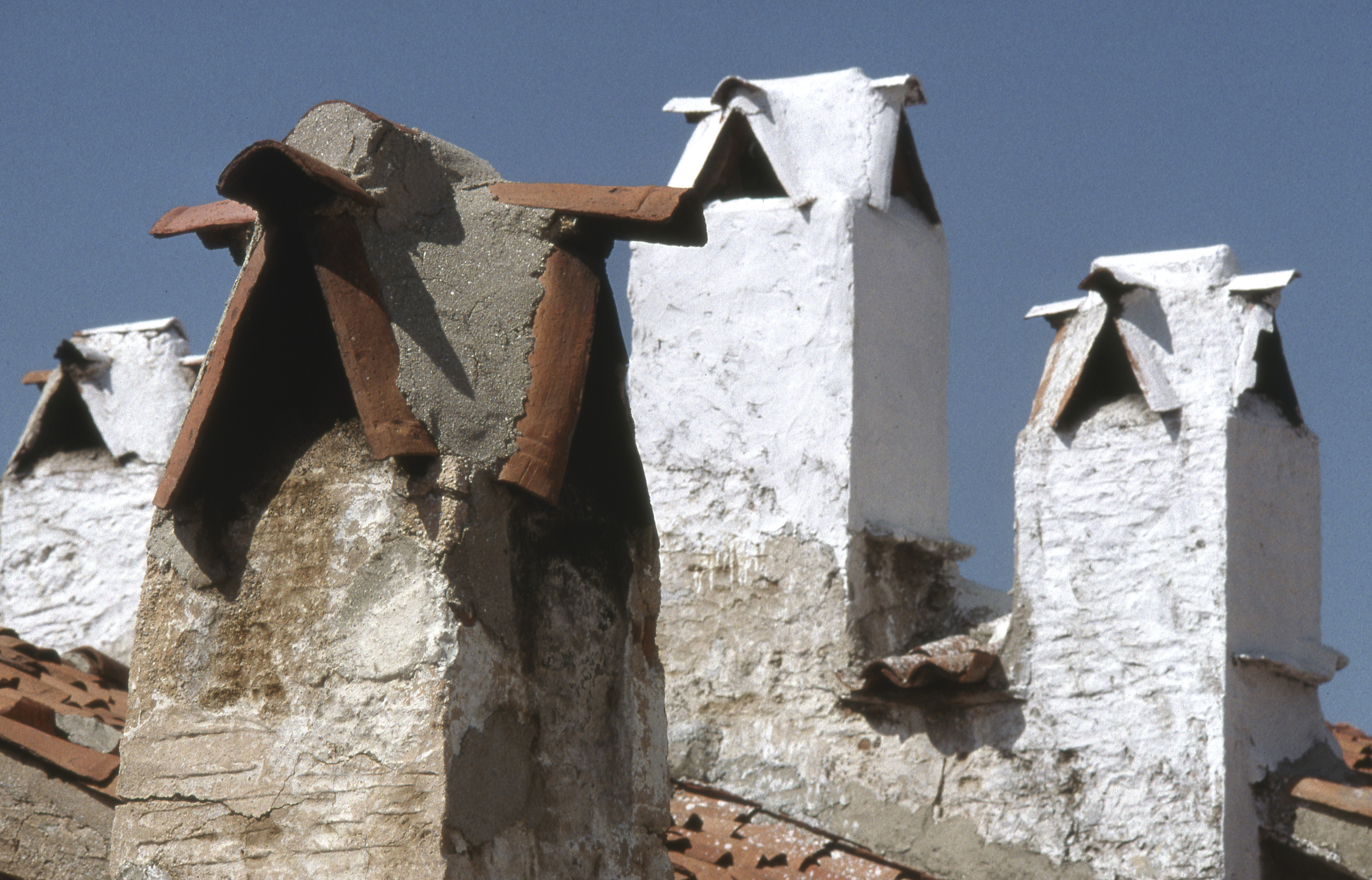
Muğla Chimneys

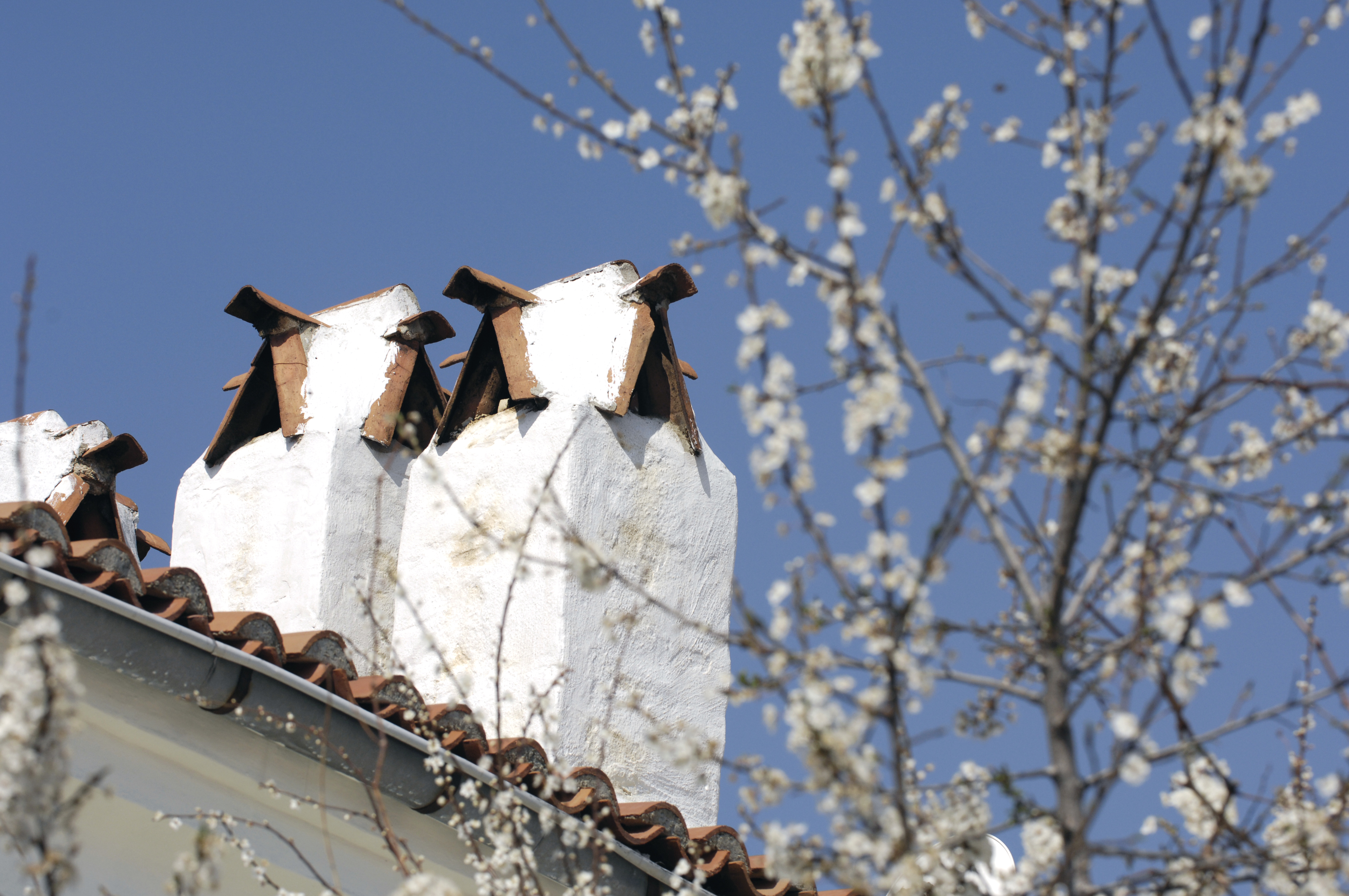
Muğla Chimneys

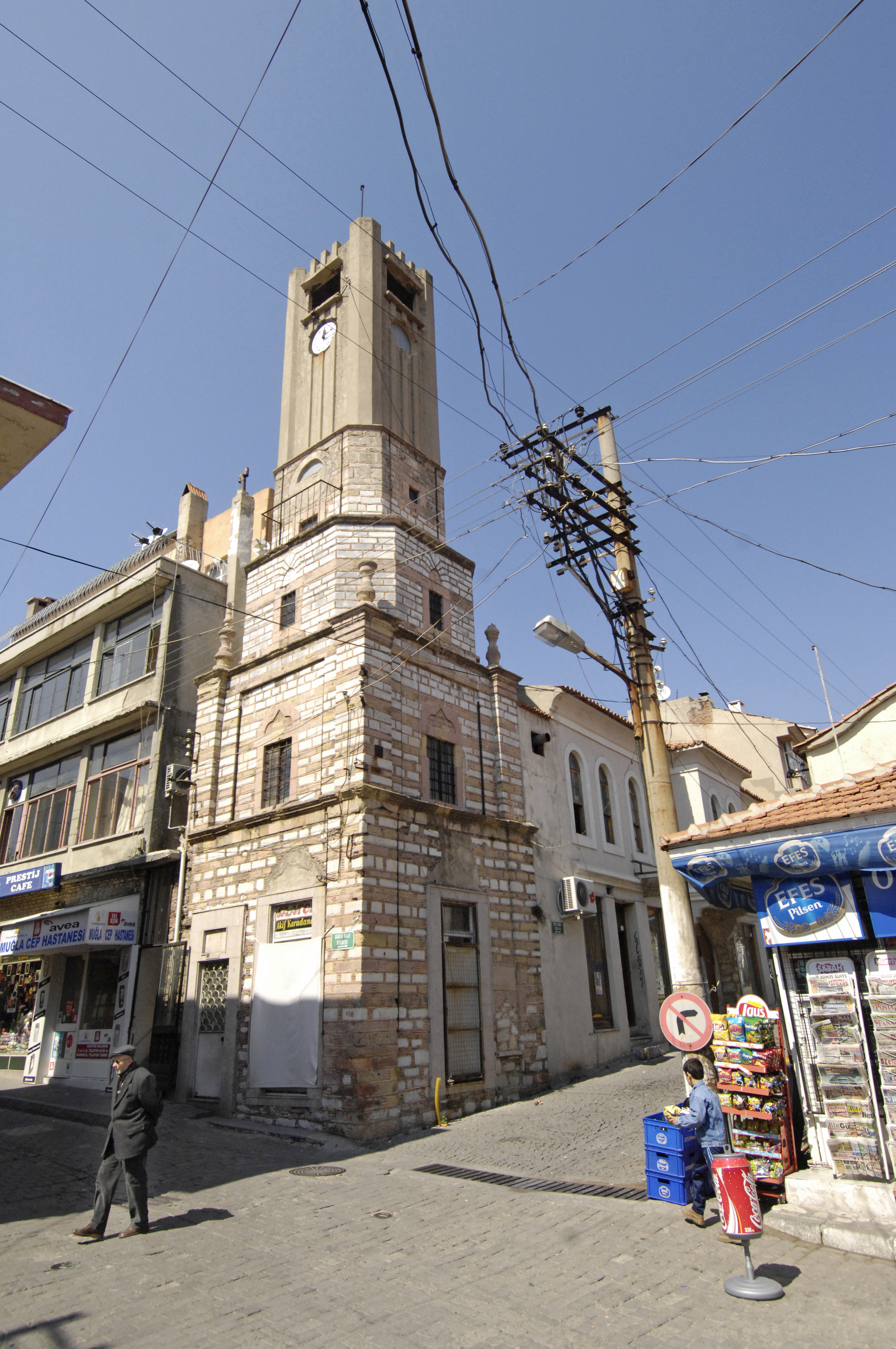
Muğla Clock tower

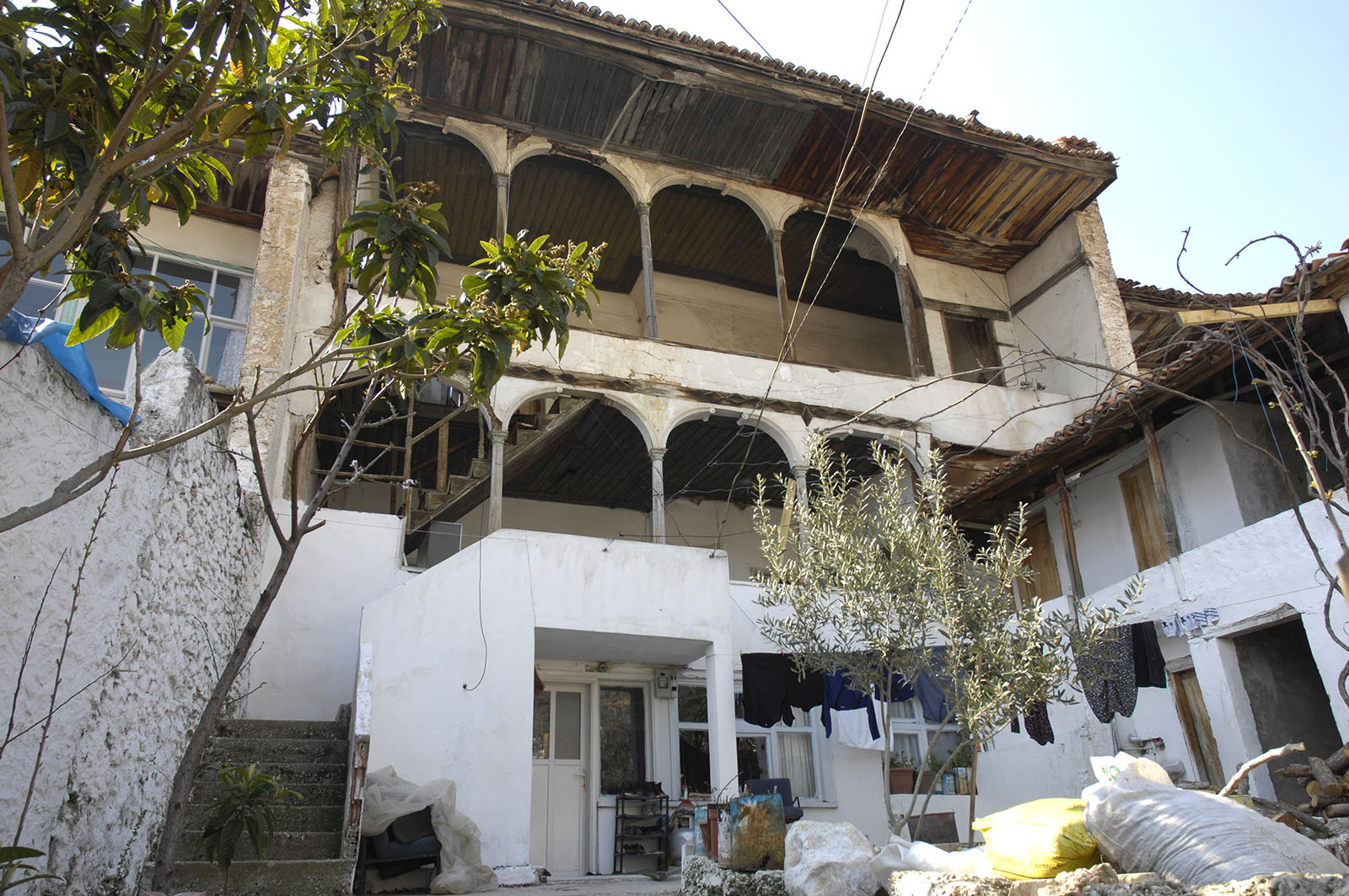
Muğla Old houses

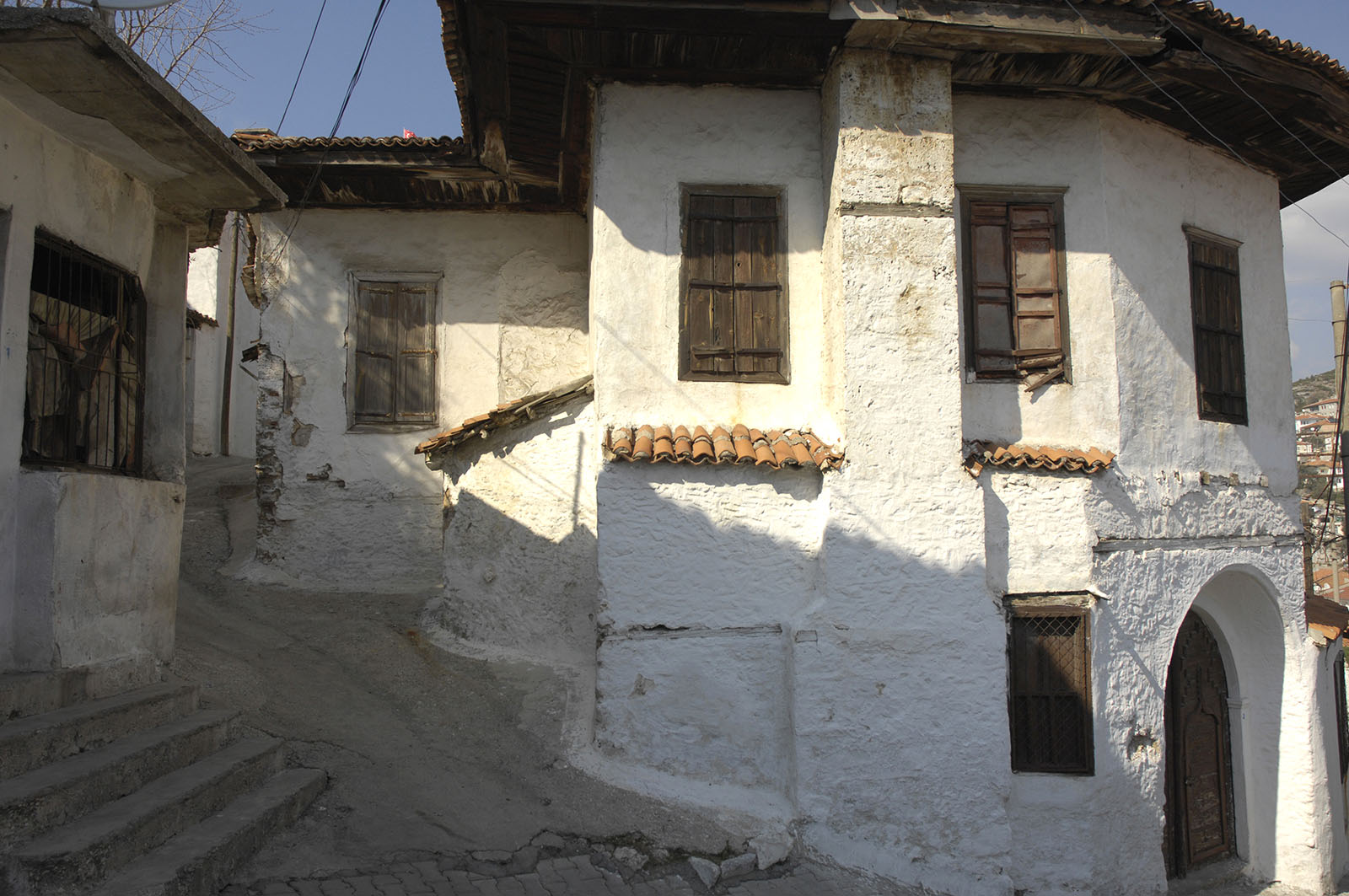
Muğla Old houses

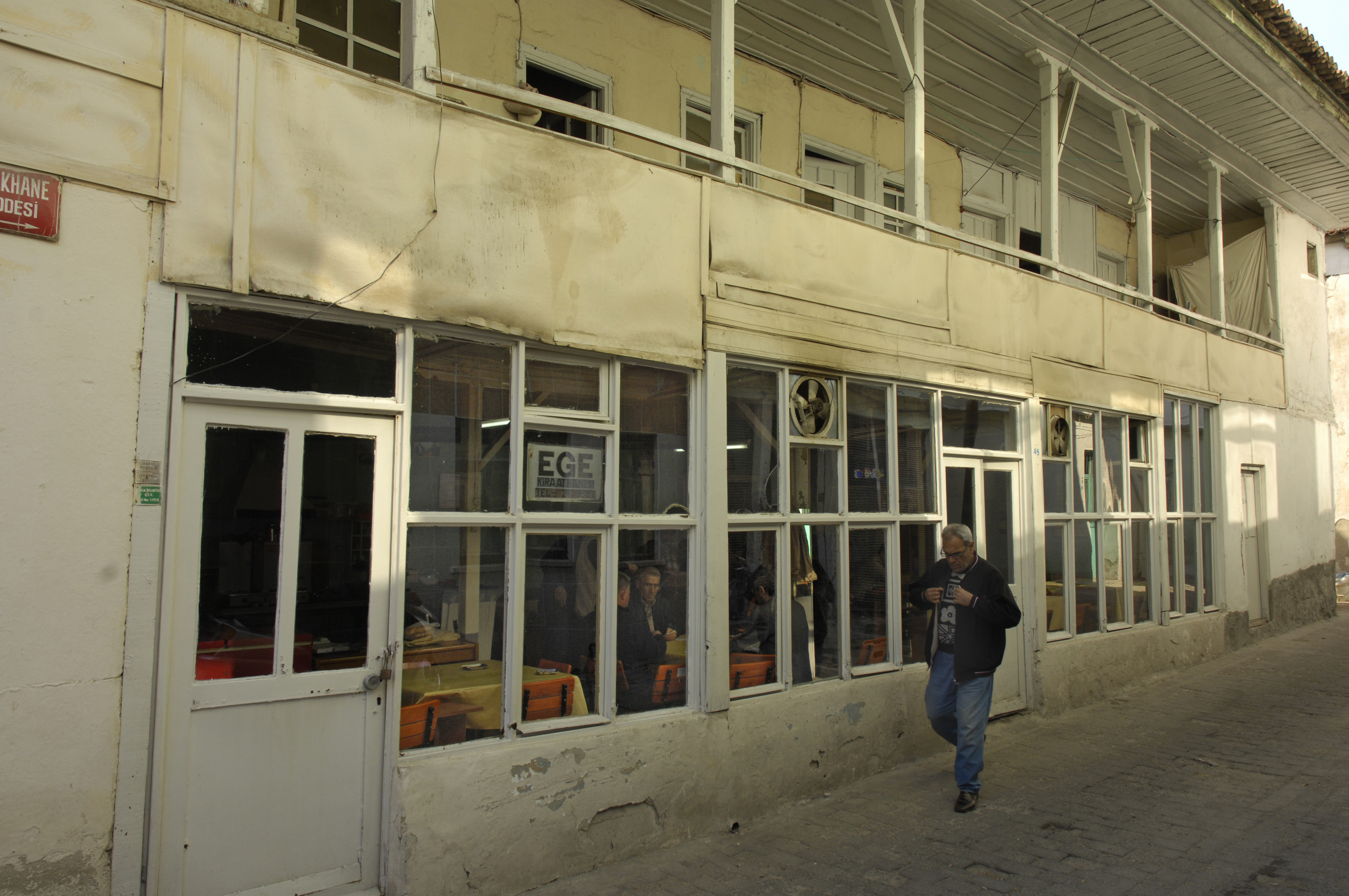
Muğla Old houses

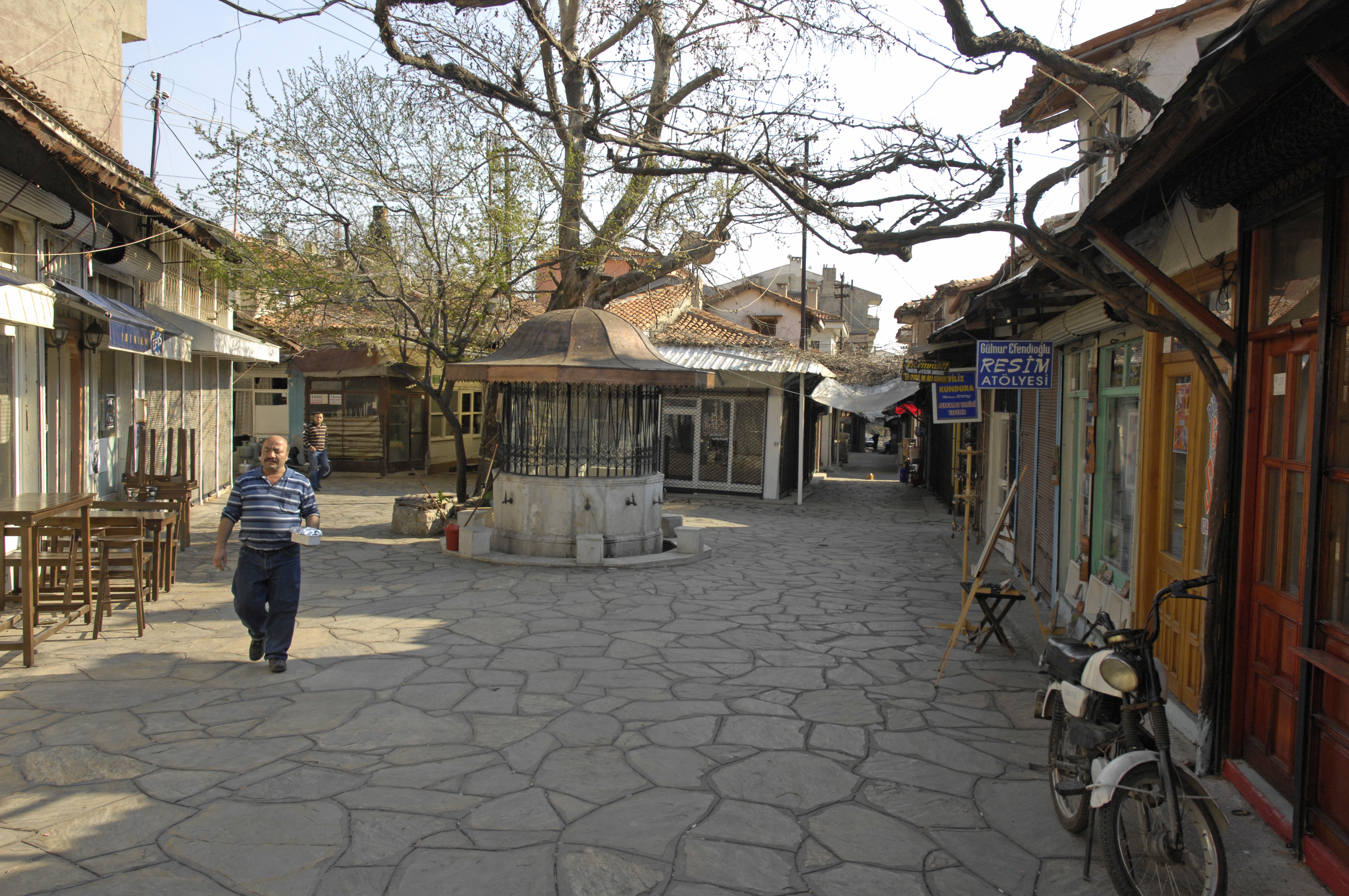
Muğla Old houses

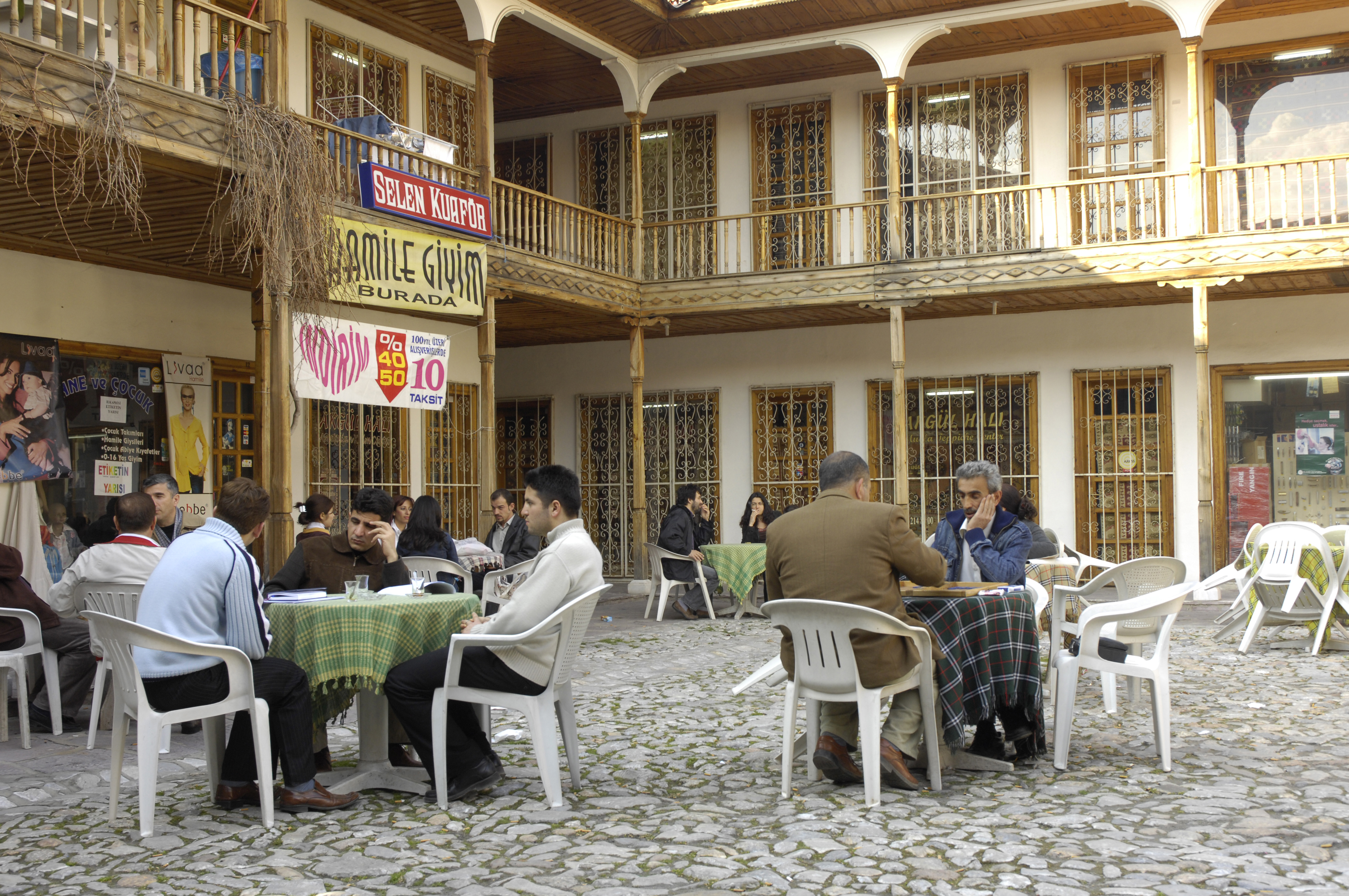
Muğla Old houses

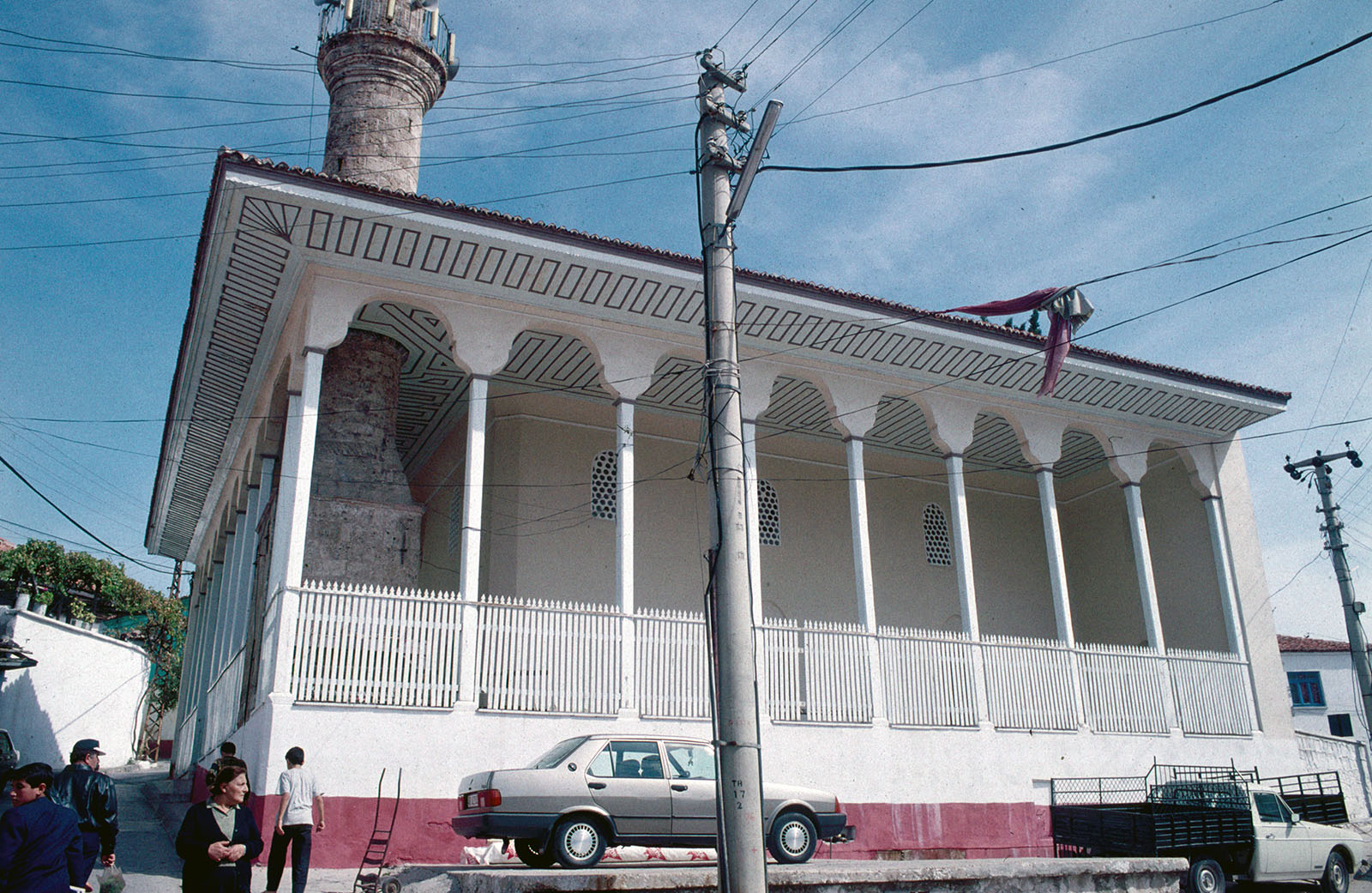
Muğla great mosque

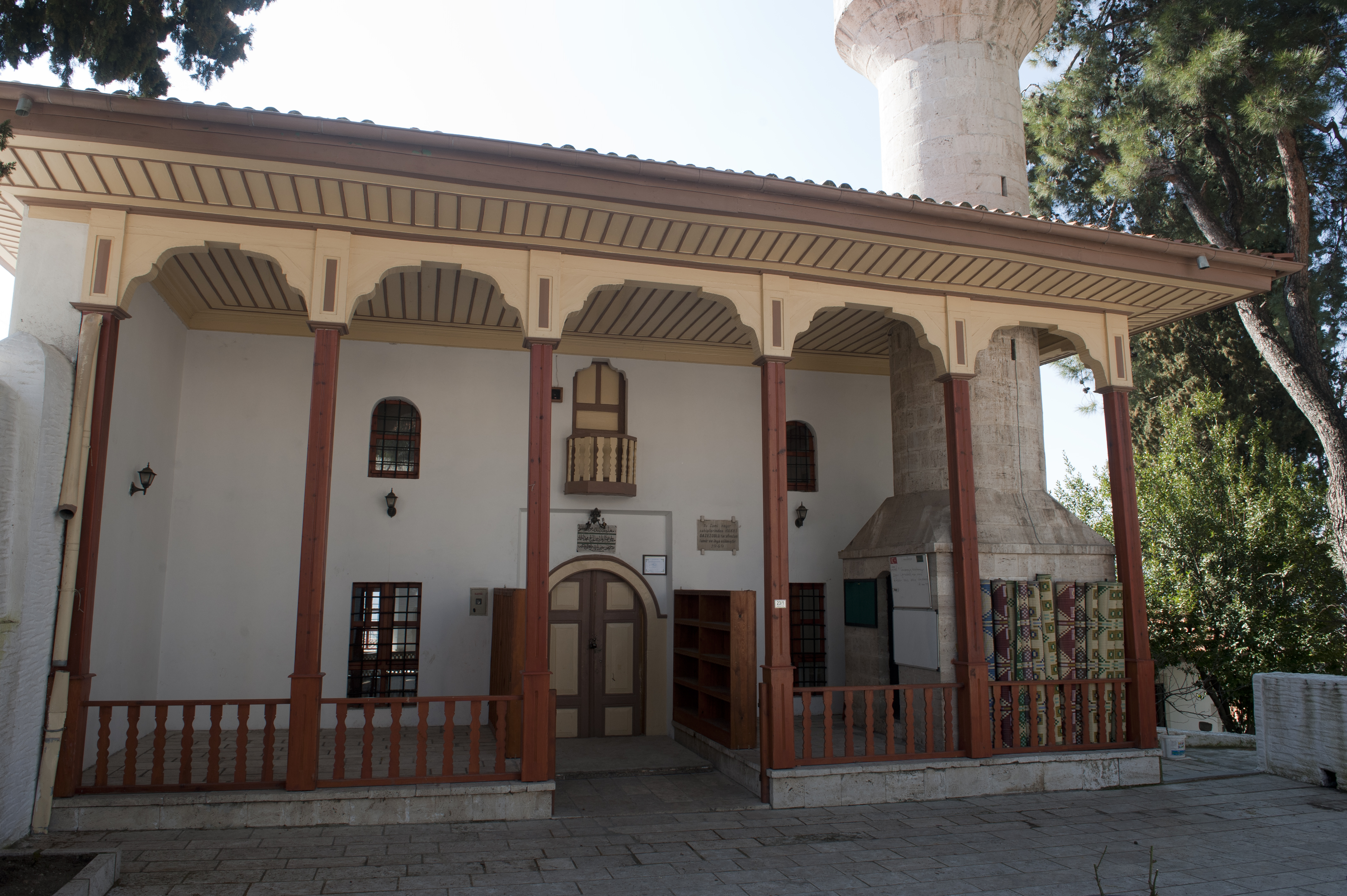
Muğla Şhahidi Camii

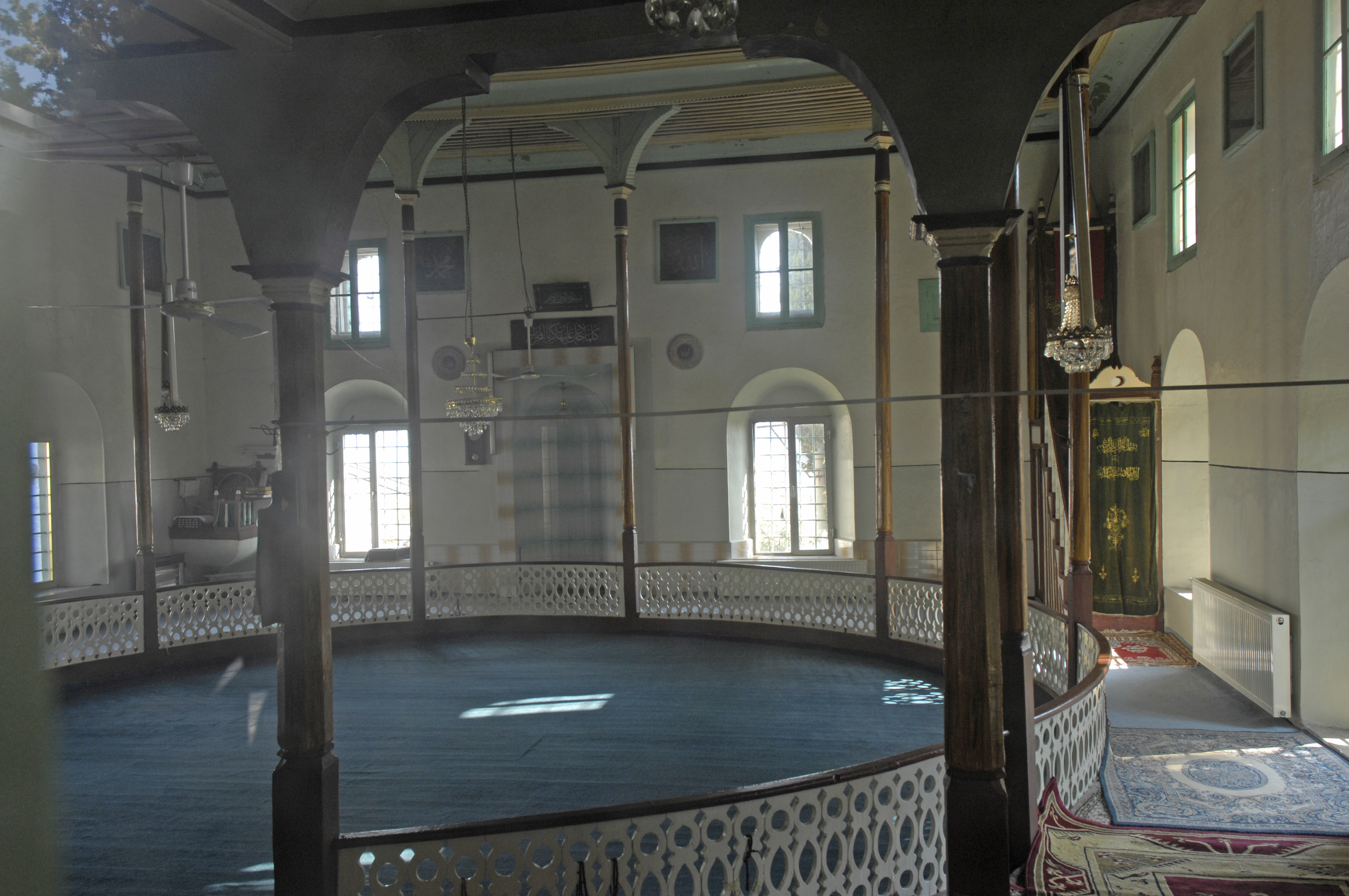
Muğla Şhahidi Camii

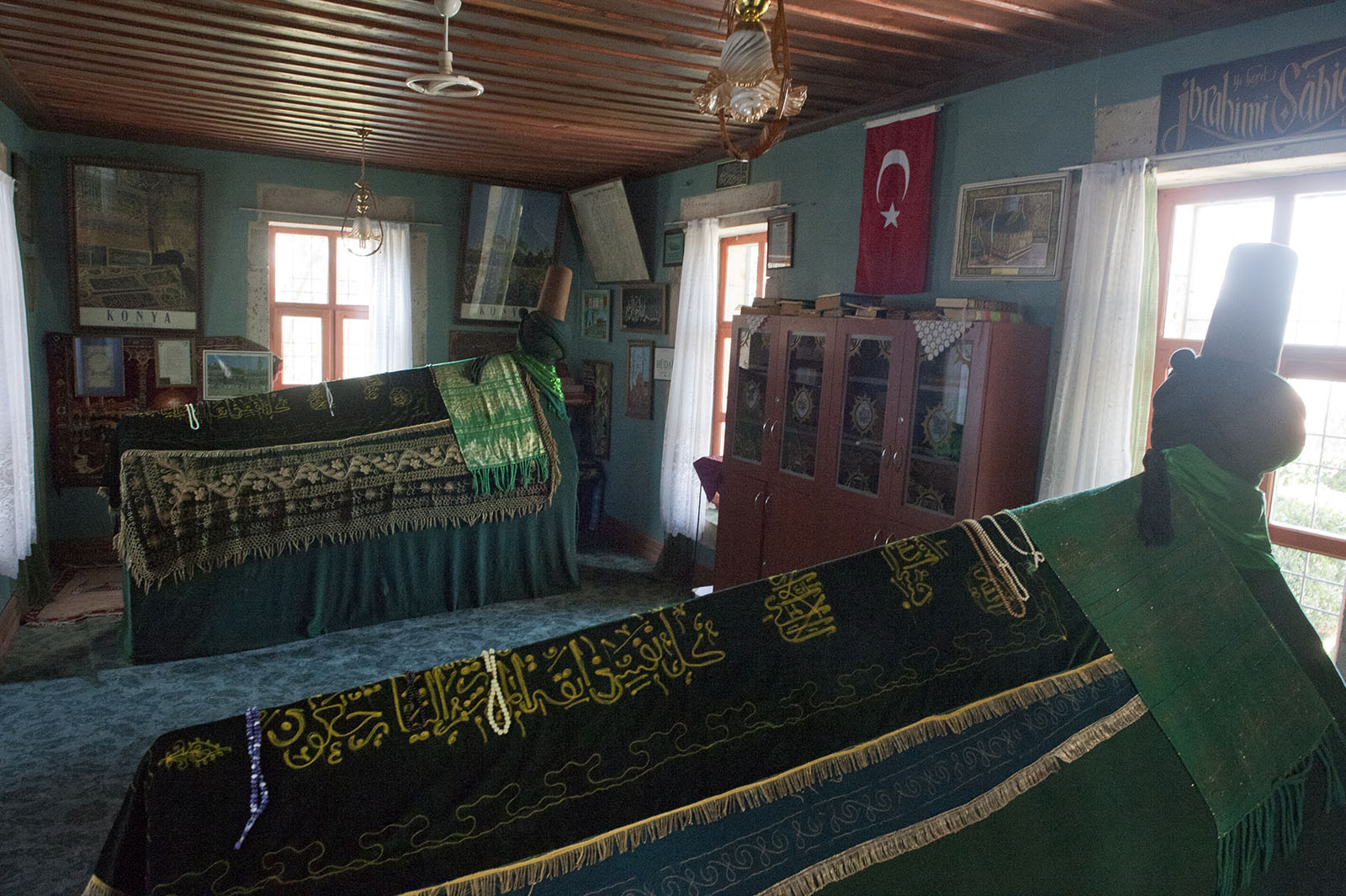
Muğla Şhahidi Camii

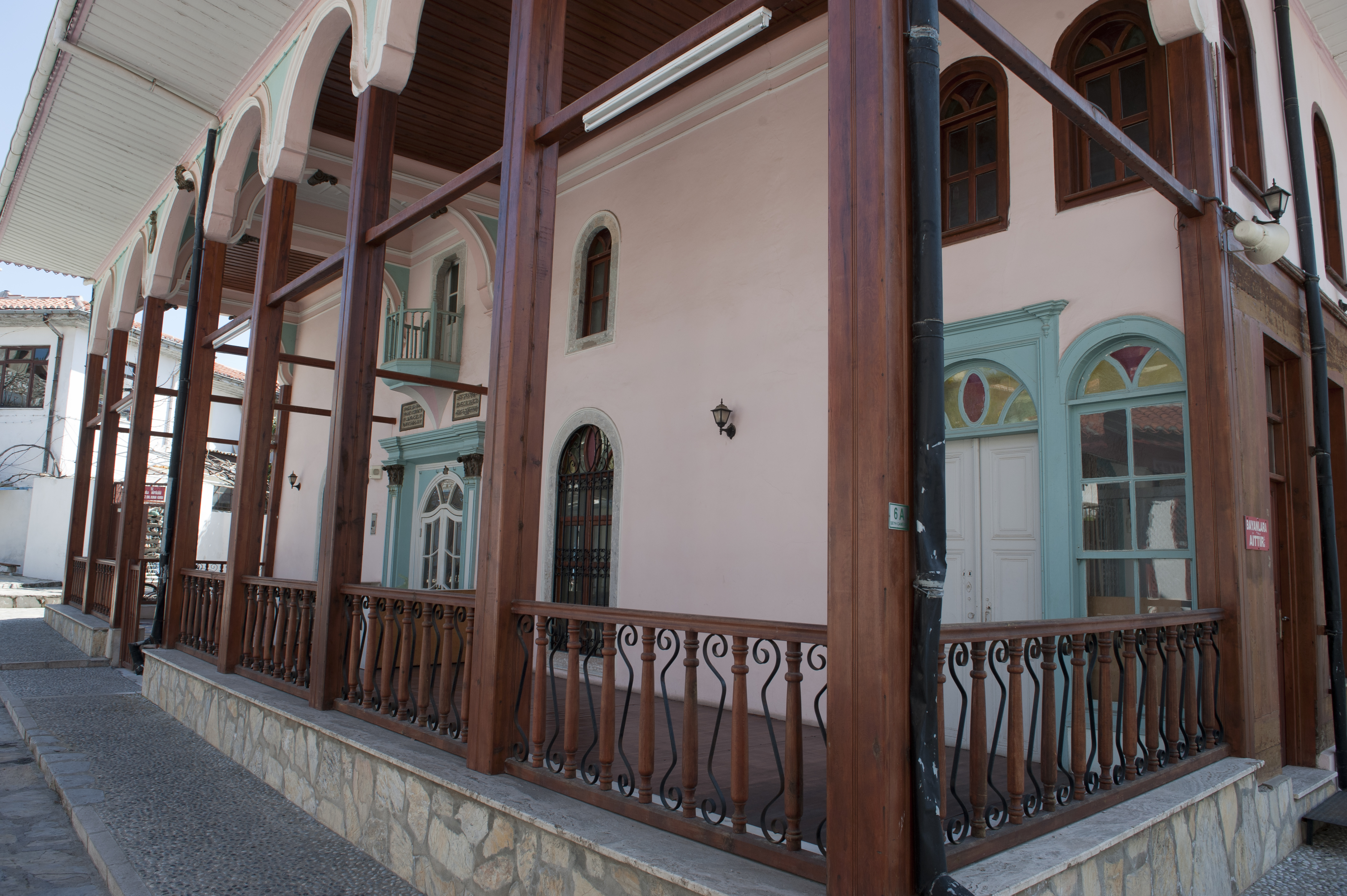
Muğla Şeyh Camii

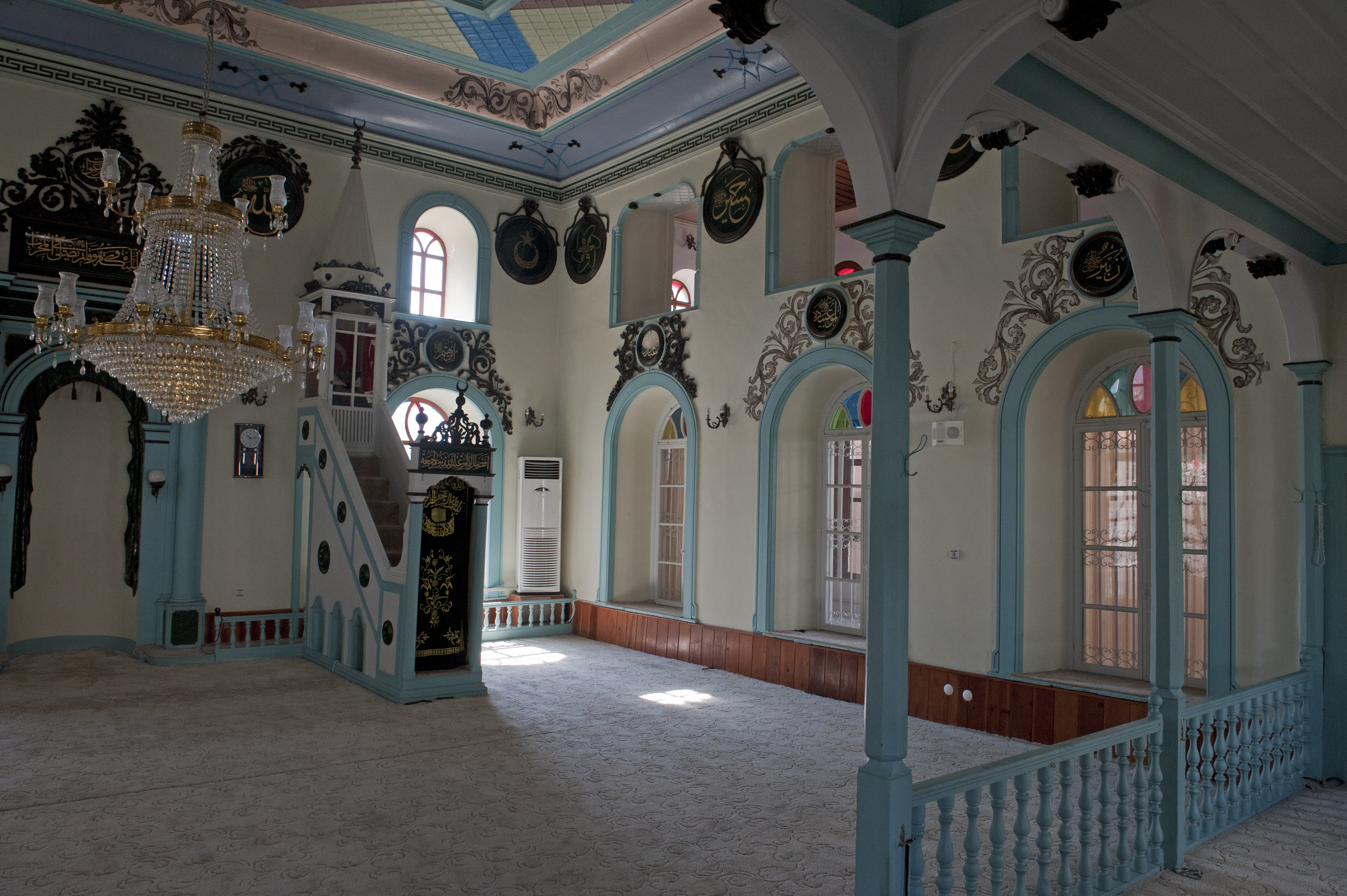
Muğla Şeyh Camii

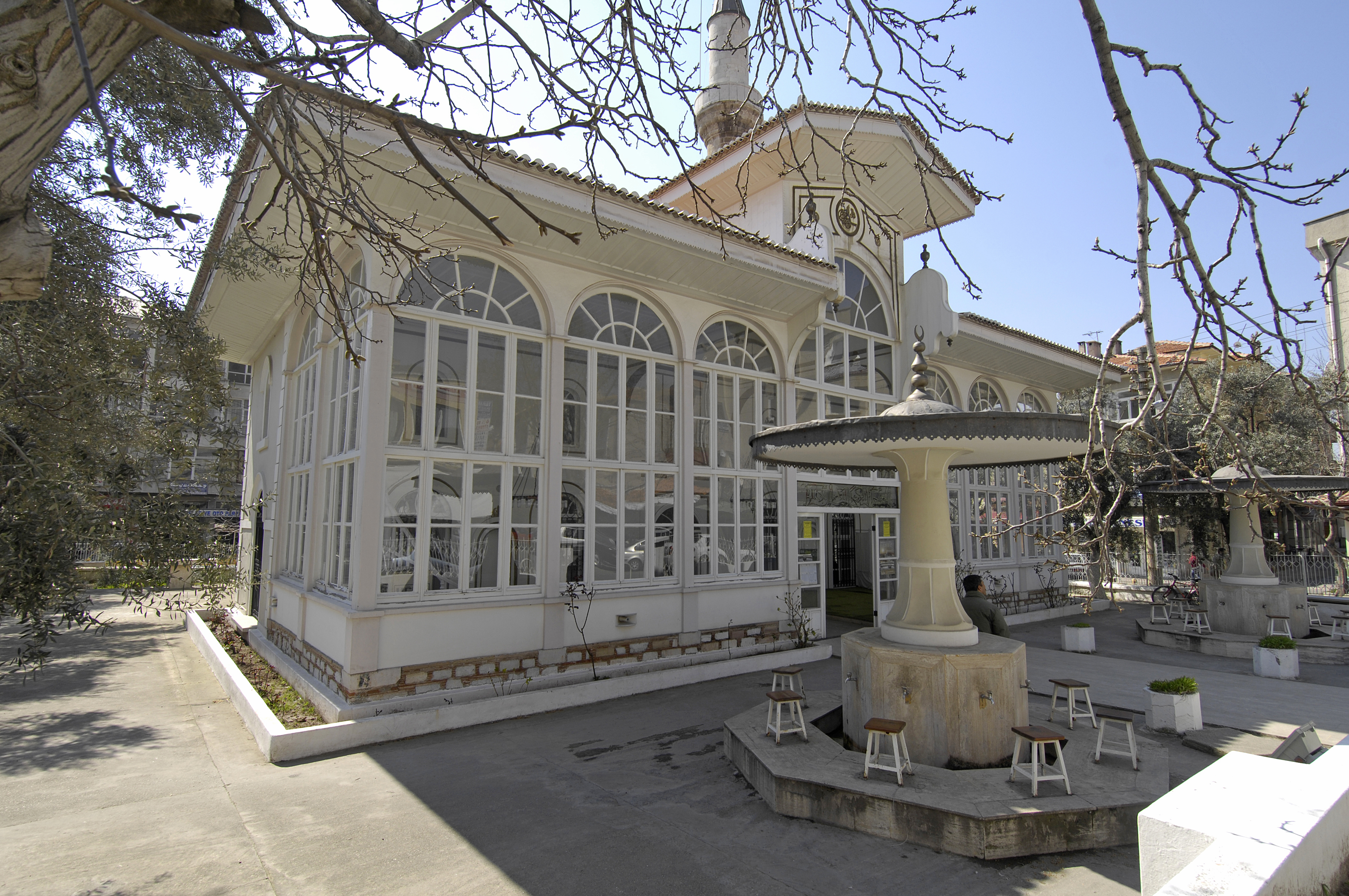
Muğla Kurşunlu Camii Front

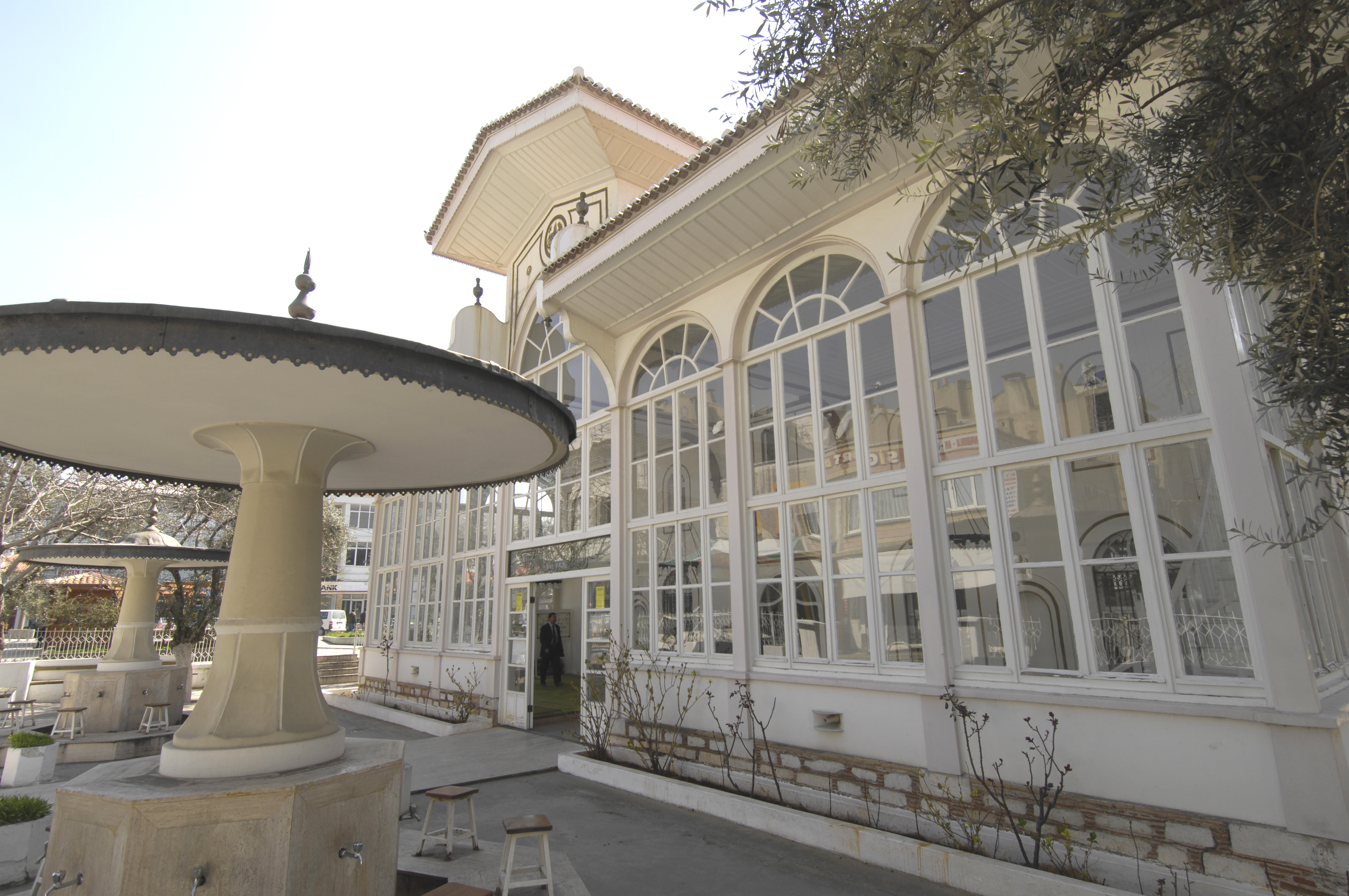
Muğla Kurşunlu Camii

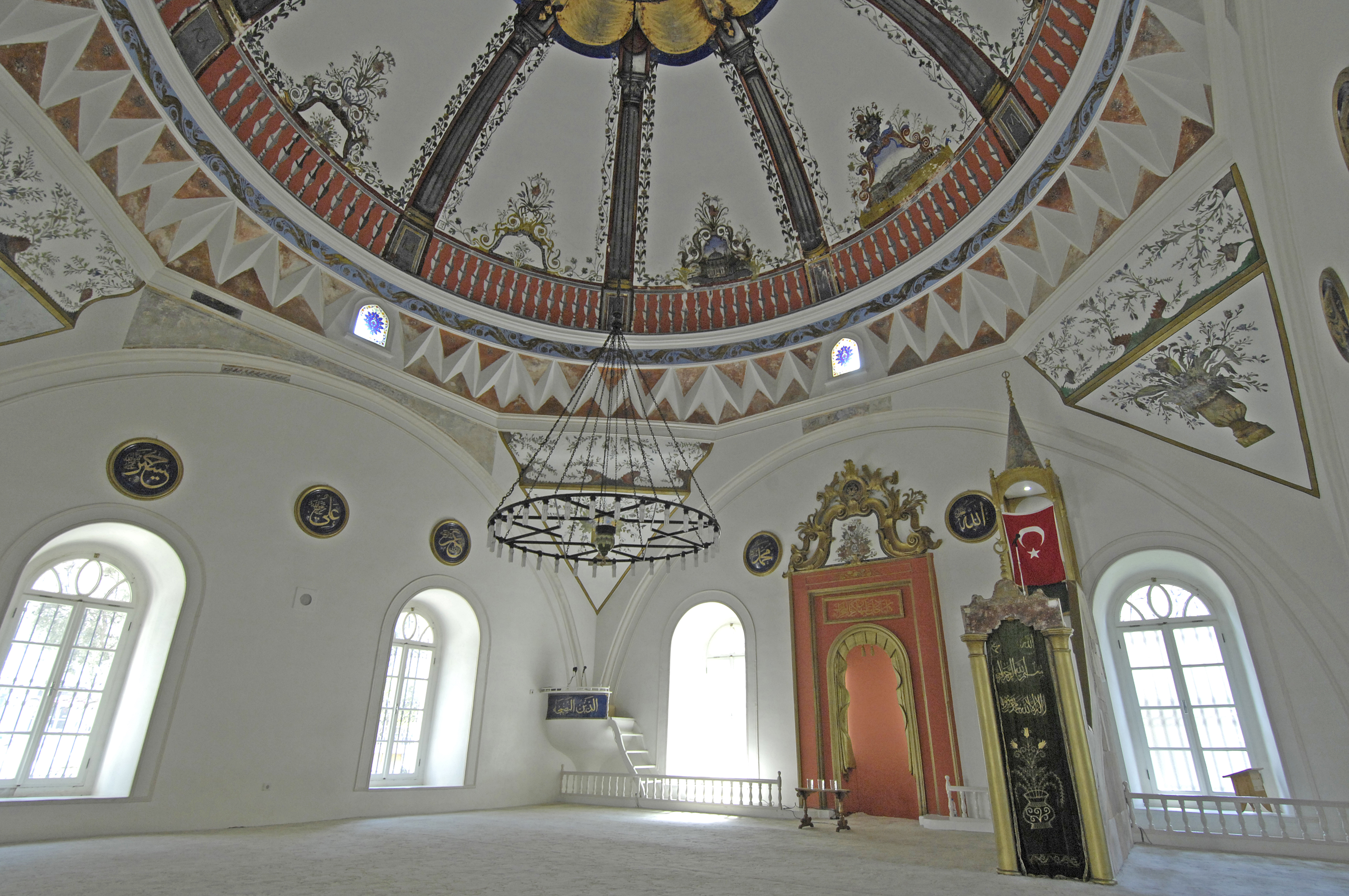
Muğla Kurşunlu Camii

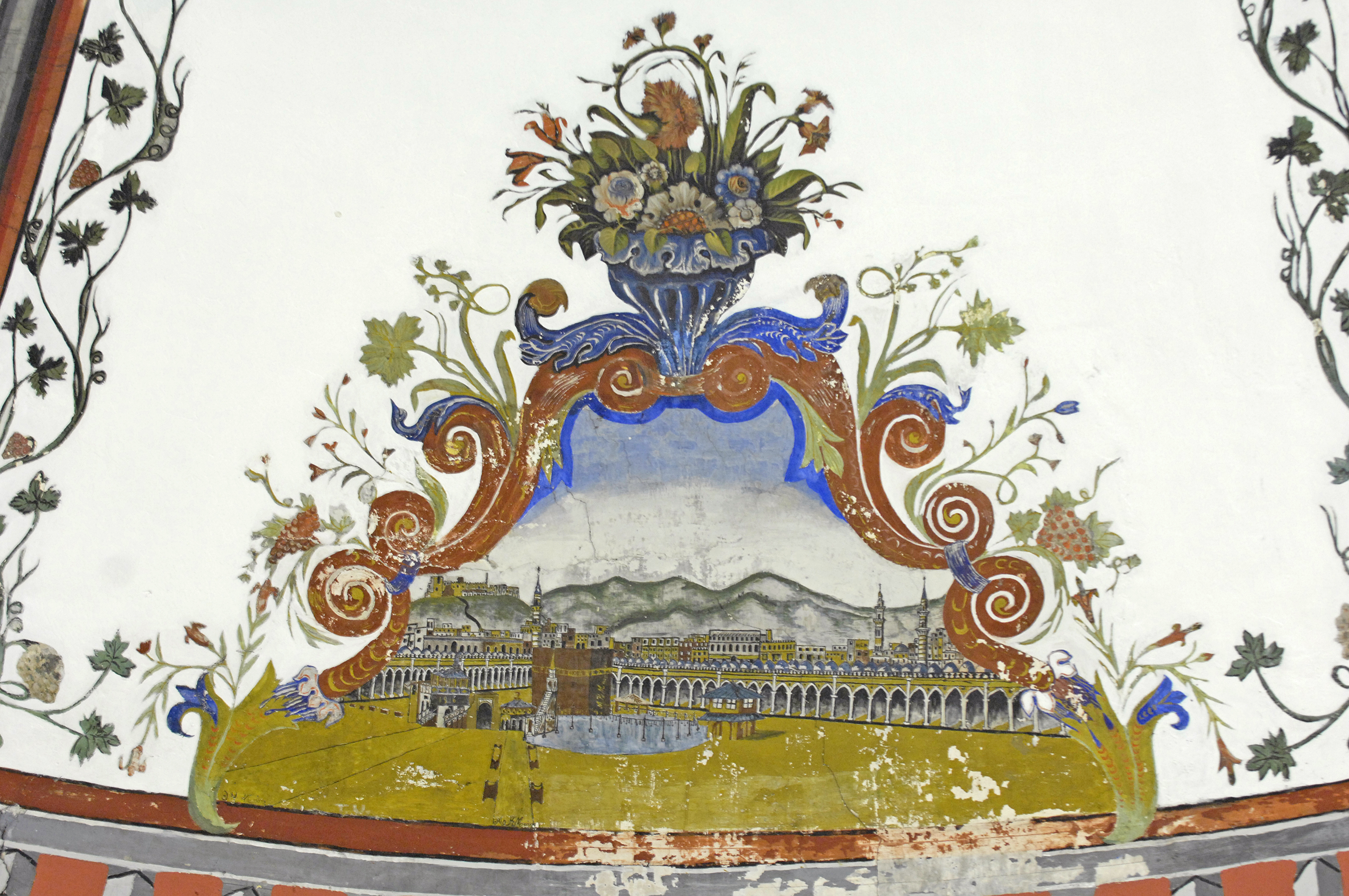
Muğla Kurşunlu Camii Painting of Mecca

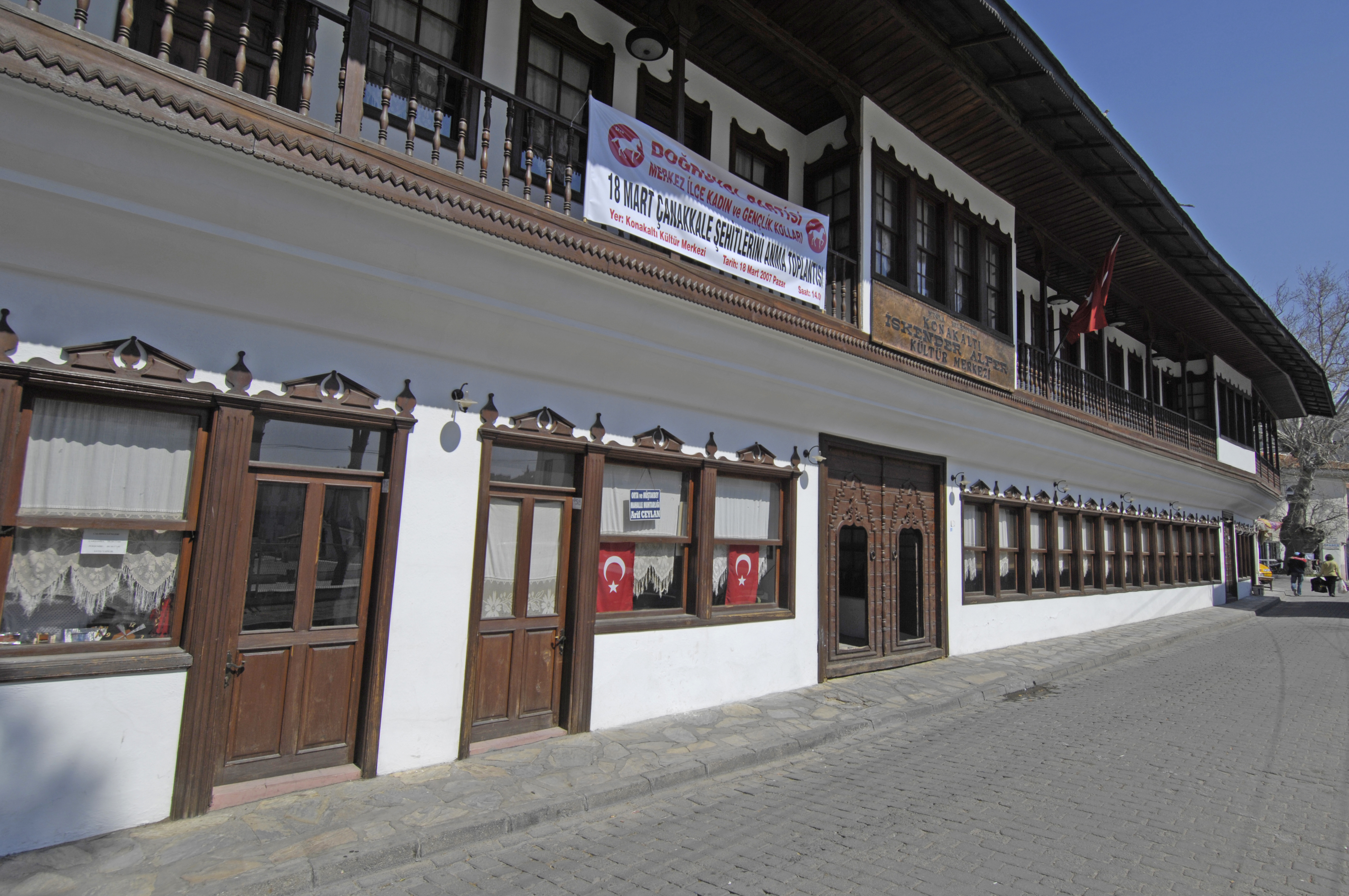
Muğla Konakaltı Han

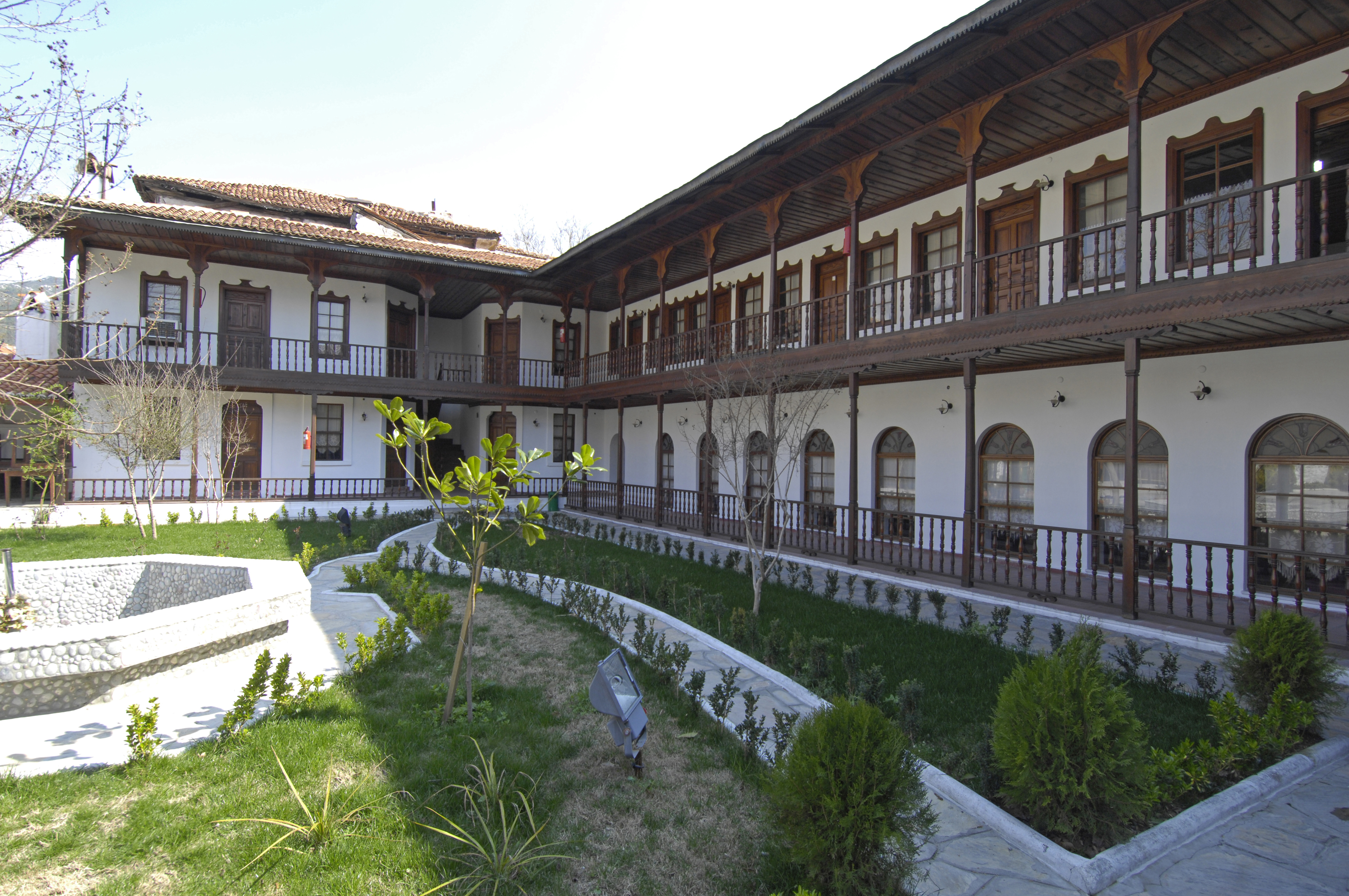
Muğla Konakaltı Han

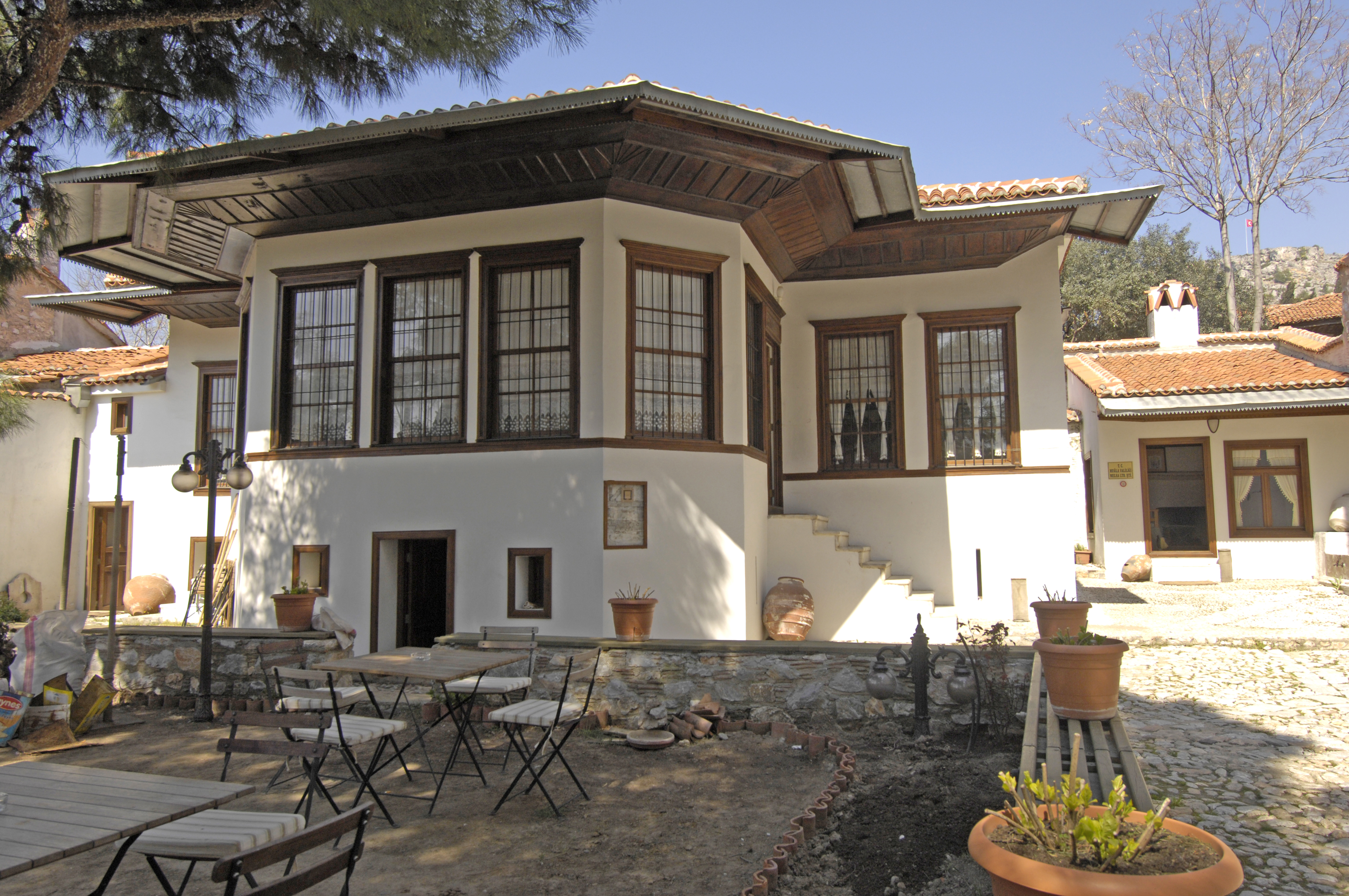
Muğla Hacıkadı Evi

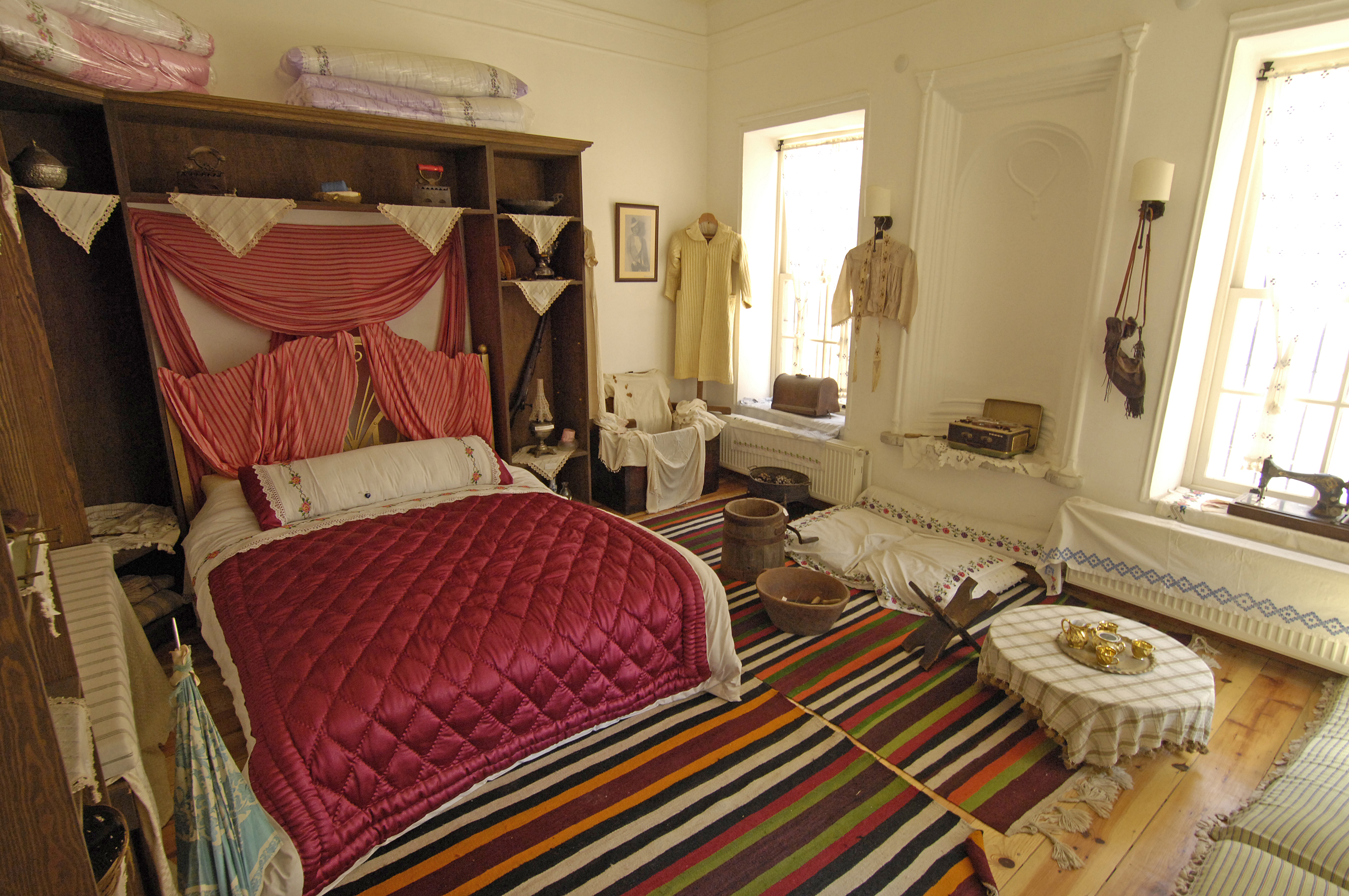
Muğla Hacıkadı Evi

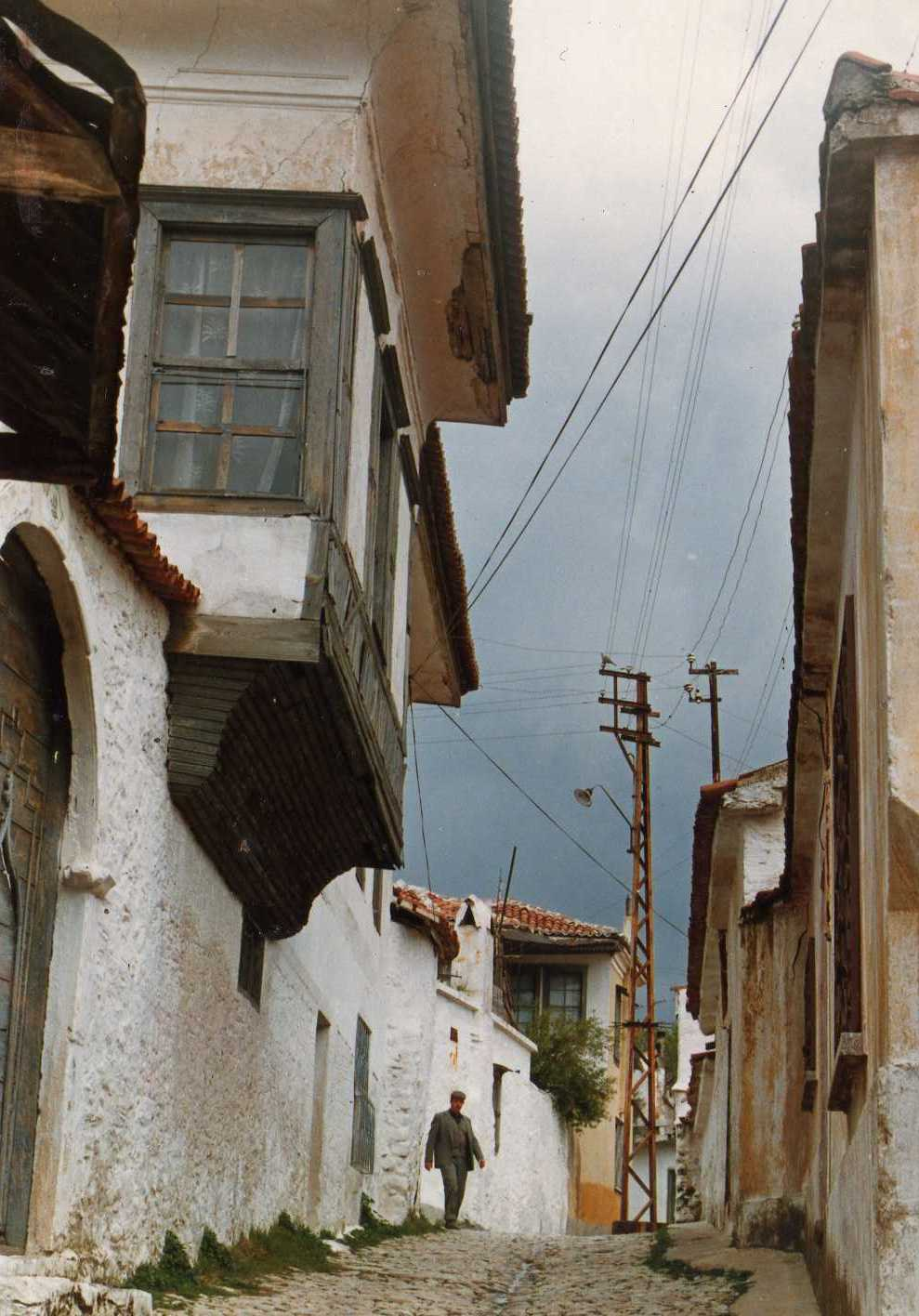
A street in the old quarter

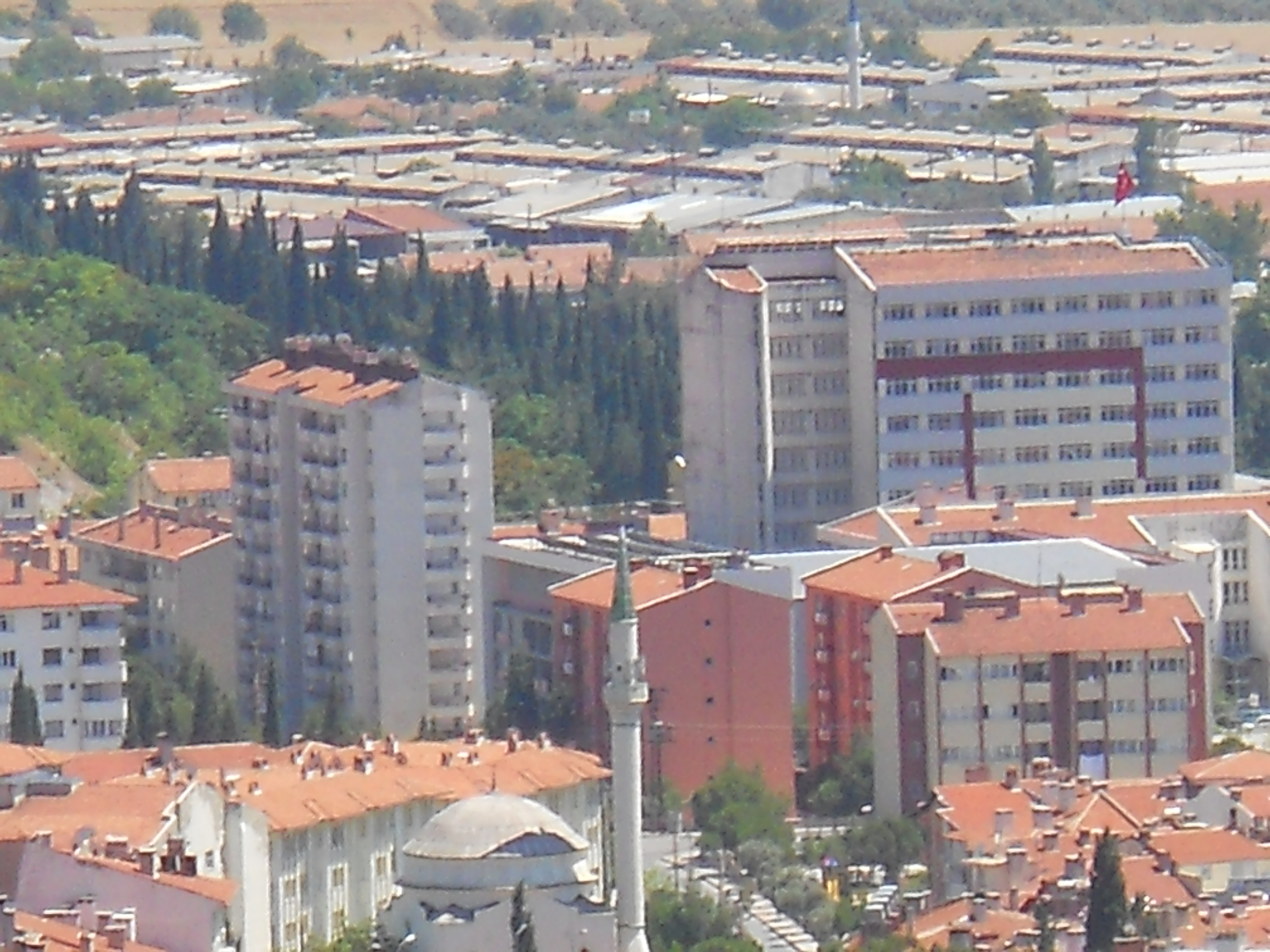
Buildings in the new part of the city.

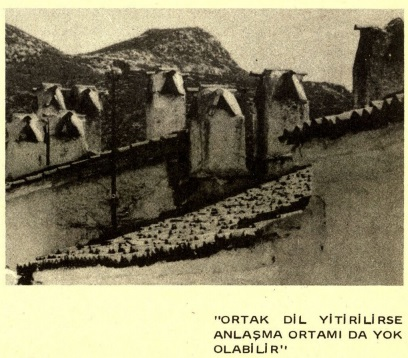
An old photograph of Muğla chimneys.

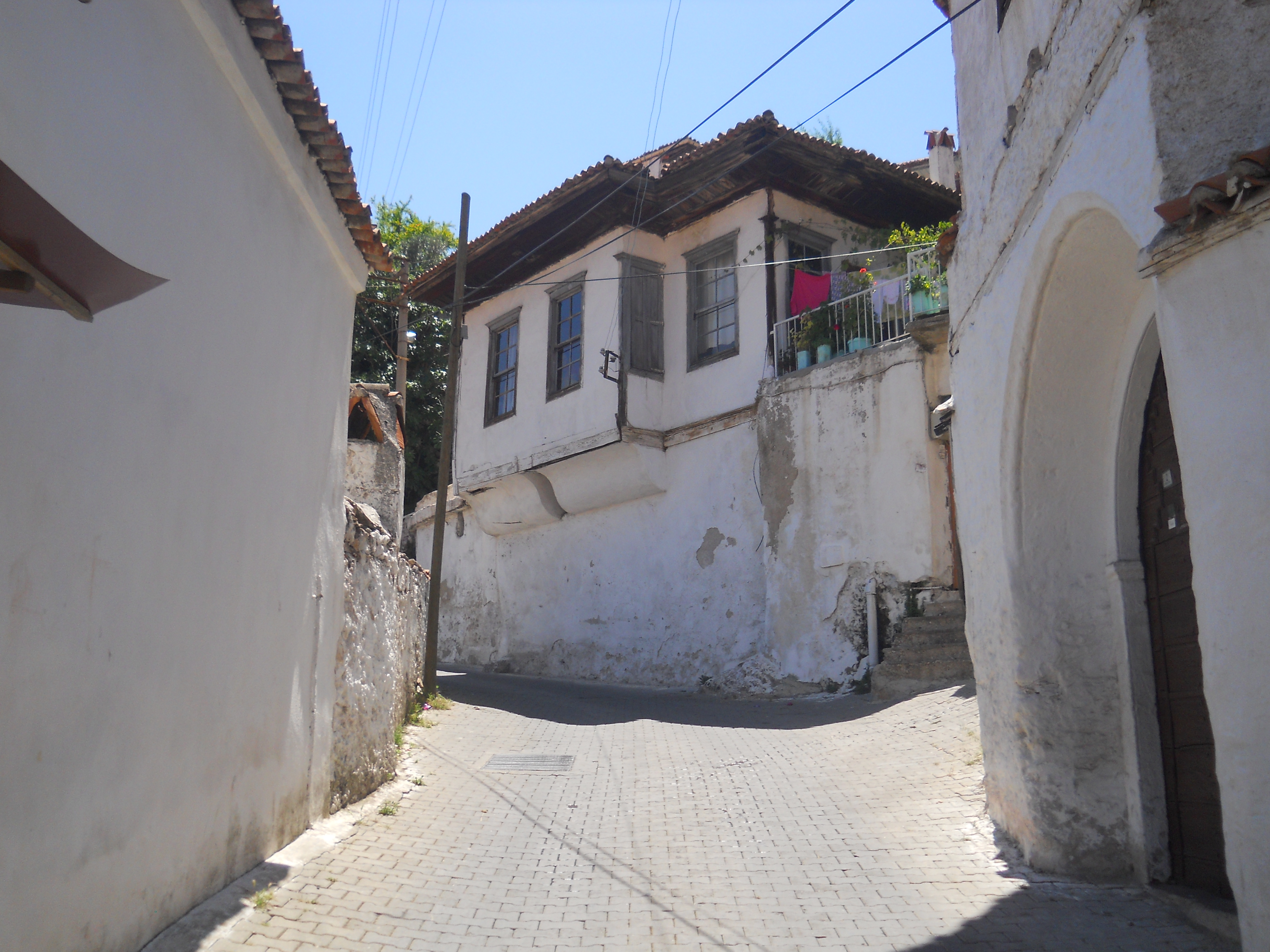
A traditional house.

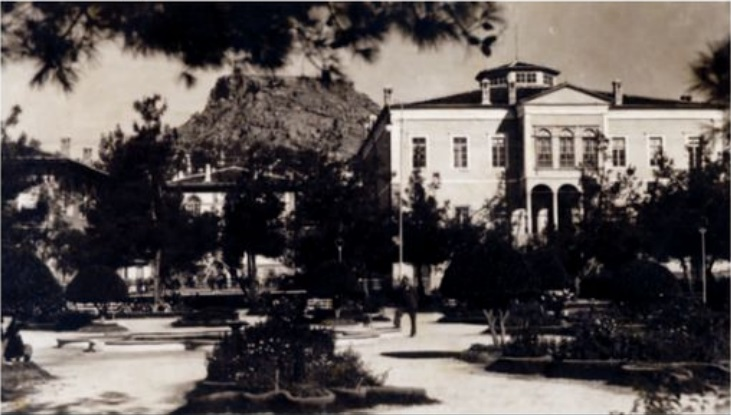
Muğla in 19th century.

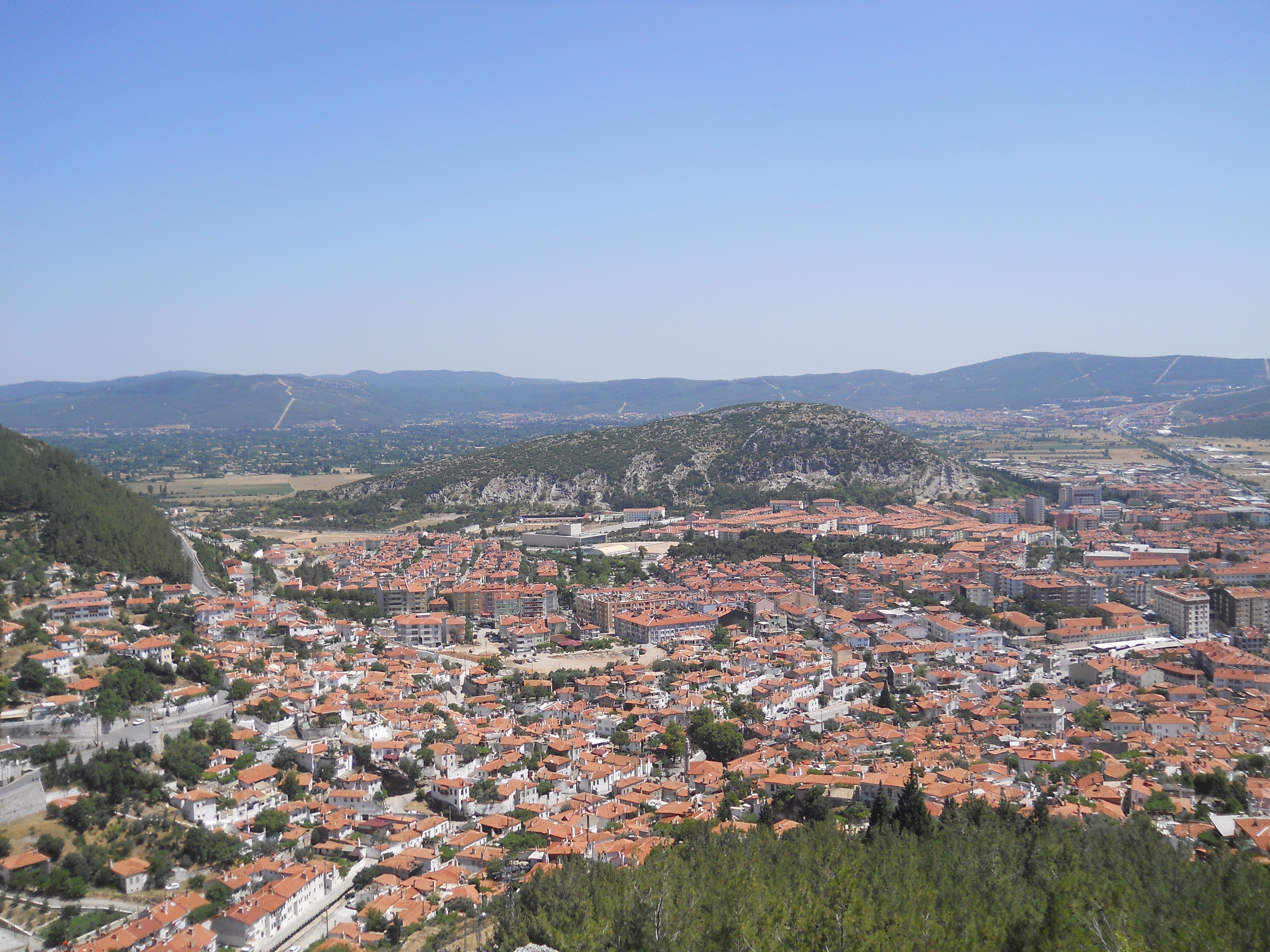
Cityscape from Mount Asar

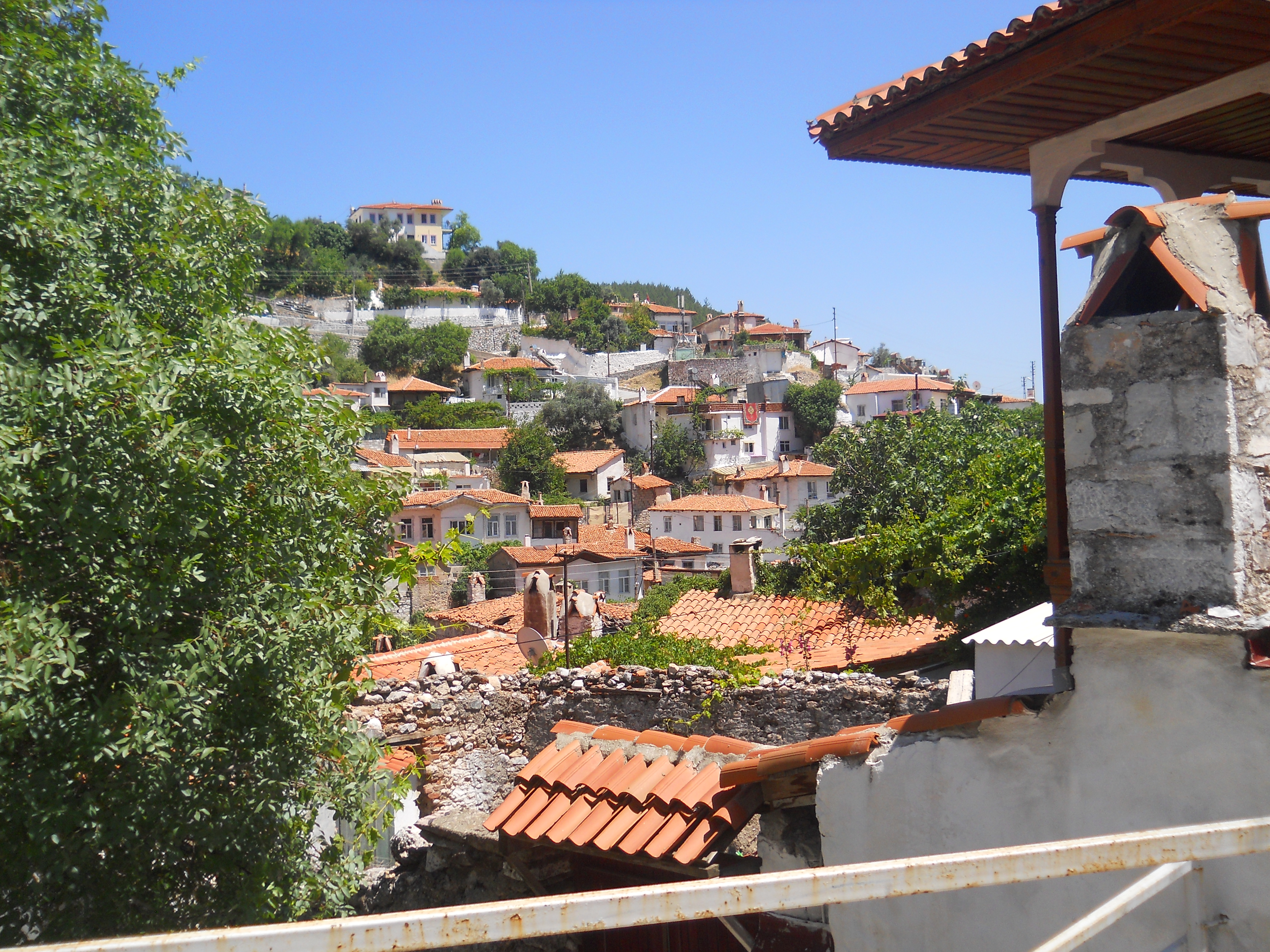
Old quarter of the city.

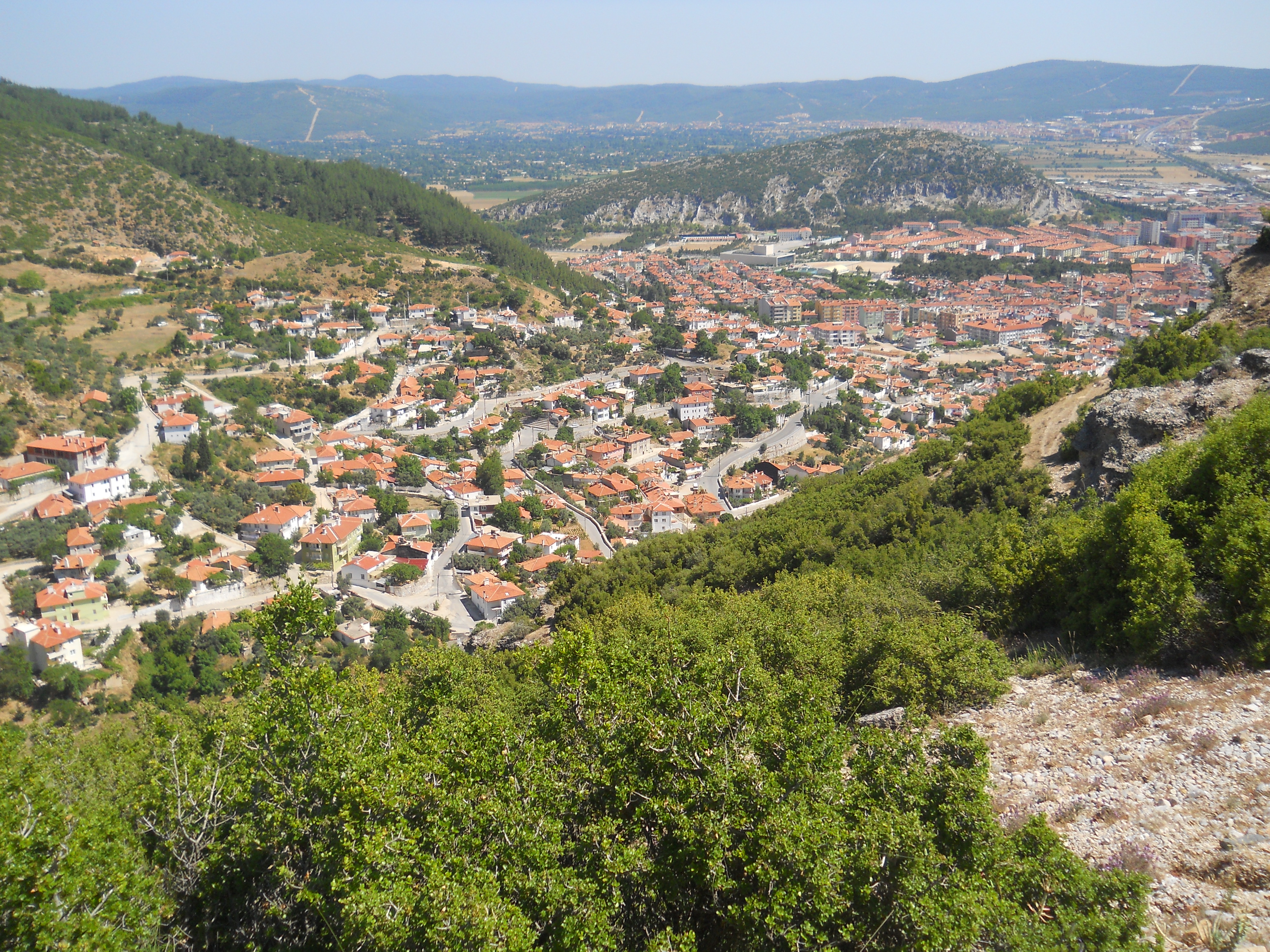
Cityscape from Mount Asar

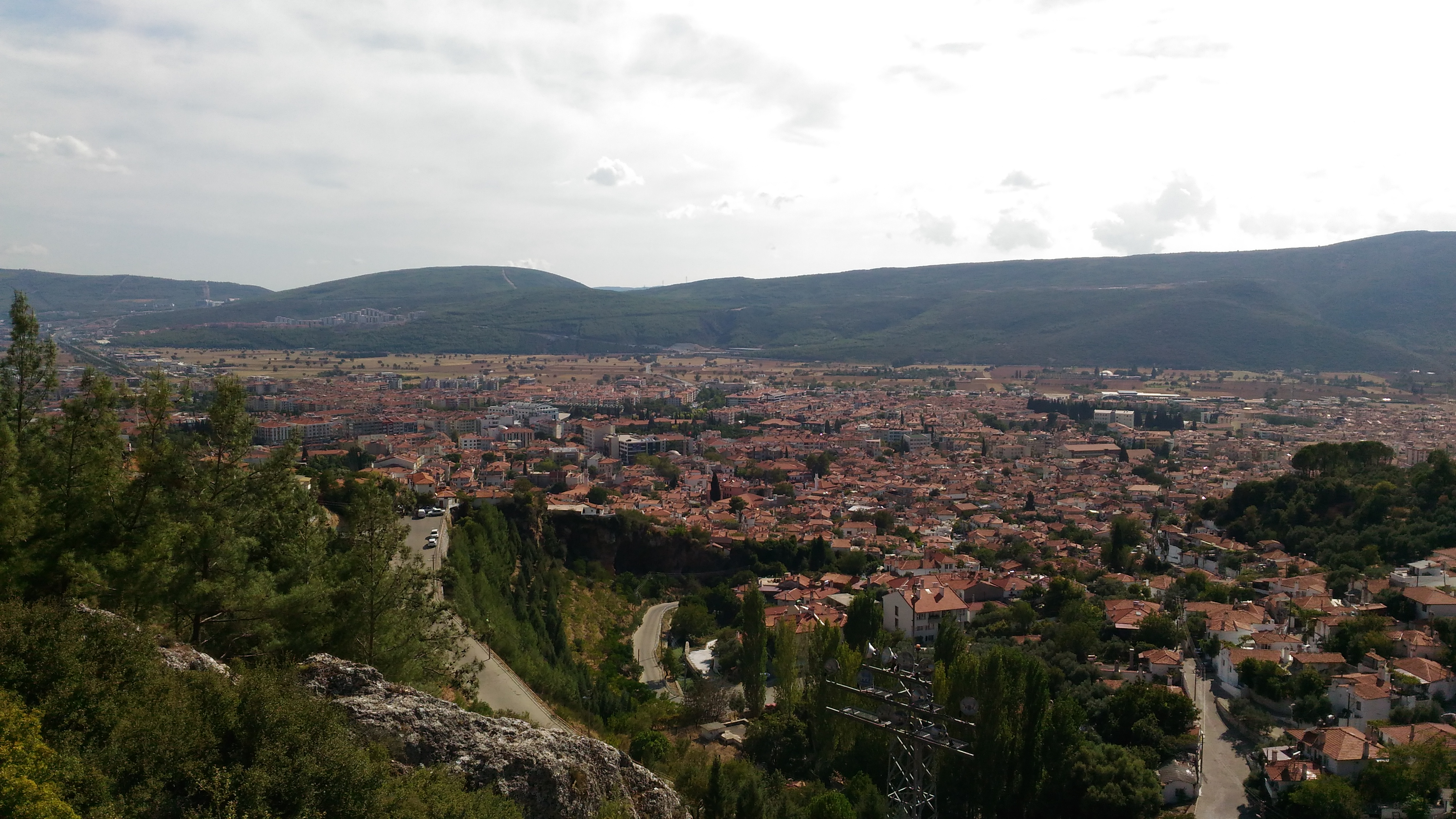
Cityscape from Mount Asar

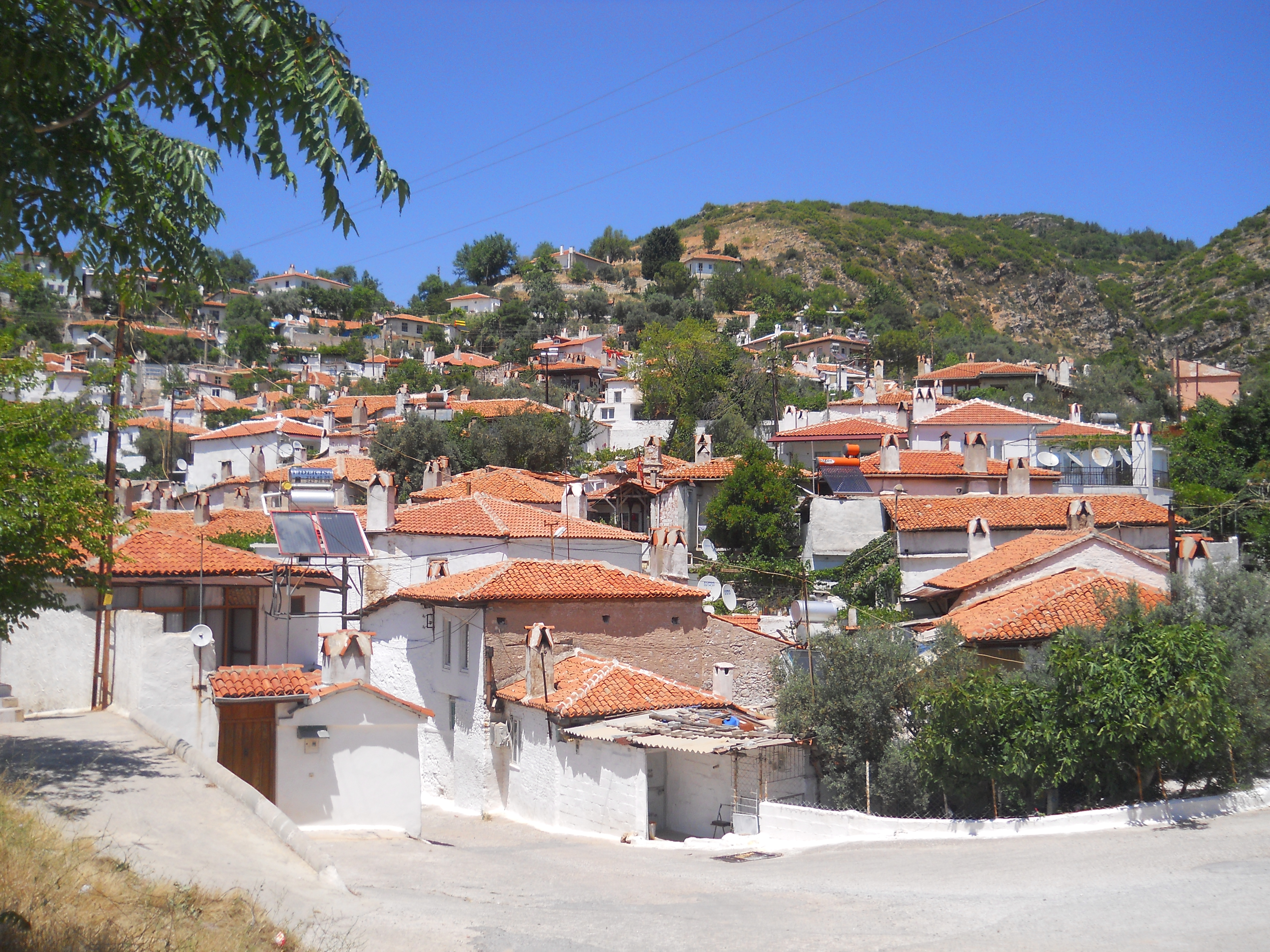
Old quarter of the city.

== Politics ==
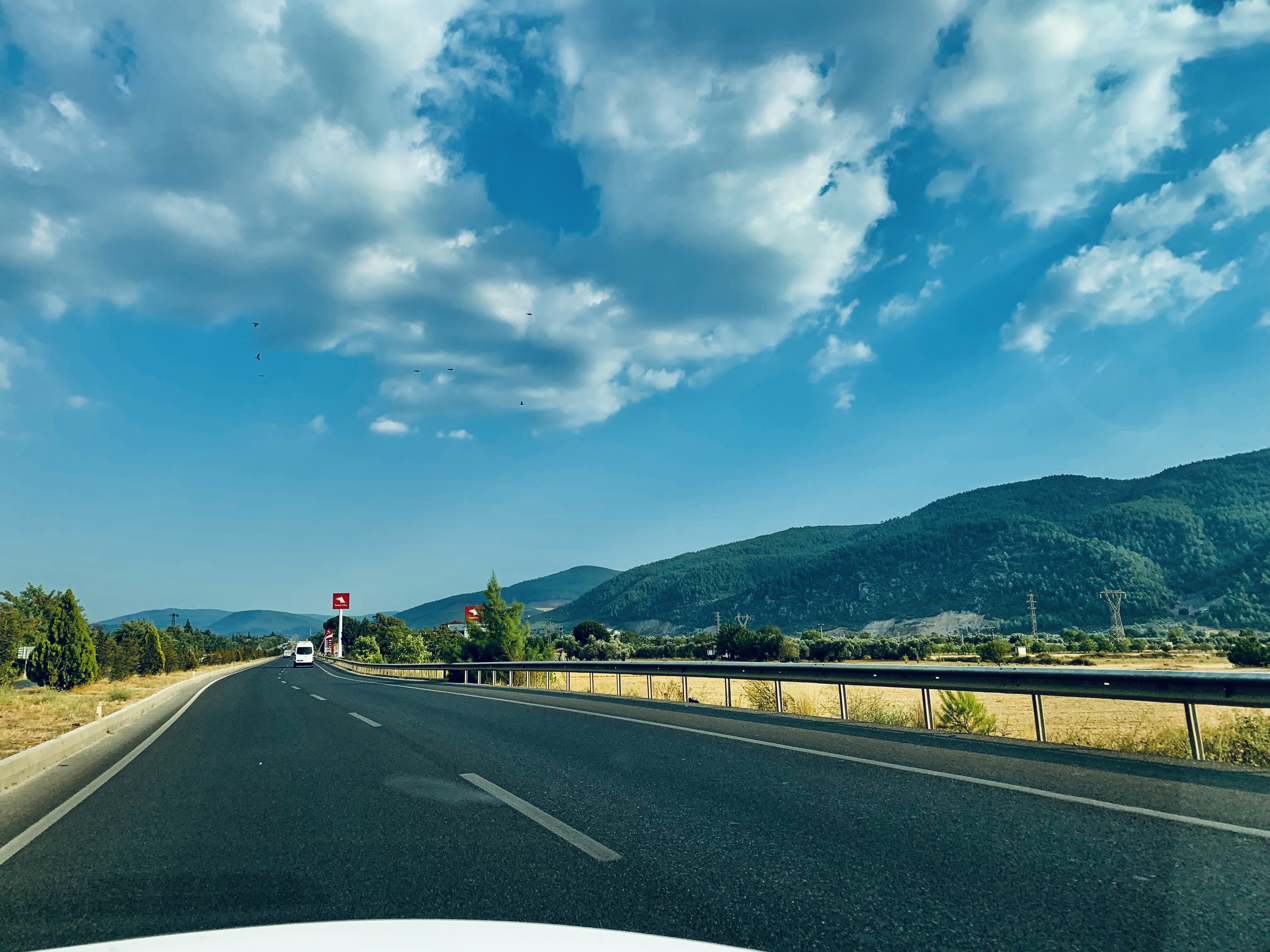
Highway in the new quarters of Muğla

Muğla's political color has traditionally been center-left. In Turkey's 2004 local elections, Dr. Osman Gürün (CHP) was re-elected, increasing his votes to 43.28%, aided in this by the abrupt virtual collapse of the other center-left party the DSP. The 2004 elections were the seventh successive victory for the center-left candidates in the Muğla municipality. Turkey's incumbent AKP and the traditional center-right DYP have each obtained (24.5–24.75%). In 2009 communal elections, MHP made a significant leap in votes and reached 24.2% of votes cast. CHP had collected almost half of the votes at 46%.

== Sports ==
The primary sports clubs operating in Muğla include Bodrum FK, Muğlaspor, Fethiyespor, Yeni Milasspor, Milas Belediyespor, Marmaris Belediyesi GSK, Yatağanspor, and Ortaca Belediyespor.

== Notable people from Muğla ==
- Şahidi İbrahim Dede – 15th–16th century Sufi poet
- Basil Zaharoff (Βασίλειος Ζαχάρωφ) - Muğla, 1849 - Monte Carlo, 1936, Greek arms dealer and industrialist
- Nail Çakırhan – 20th century poet and architect
- Zihni Derin – 20th century agronomist and agriculturalist who pioneered tea production in Turkey

== See also ==
- Caria
- Menteşe (district)
- Menteşe (beylik) (Anatolian beyliks)
- Muğla University
- Mesut of Menteşe

== Sources ==
- Bean, George Ewart (1989). Turkey beyond the Meander. London, UK: John Murray Publishers. ISBN 978-0-7195-4663-1.
