= List of municipalities in Muğla Province =

This is the list of municipalities in Muğla Province, Turkey, as of October 2007.

== Municipalities ==
List is sorted alphabetically A-Z, as Districts->Municipalities.

District	Municipality
Bodrum	Bitez
Bodrum	Bodrum
Bodrum	Göltürkbükü
Bodrum	Gümüşlük
Bodrum	Gündoğan
Bodrum	Konacık
Bodrum	Mumcular
Bodrum	Ortakentyahşi
Bodrum	Turgutreis
Bodrum	Yalı
Bodrum	Yalıkavak
Dalaman	Dalaman
Datça	Datça
Fethiye	Çamköy
Fethiye	Çiftlik
Fethiye	Eşen
Fethiye	Fethiye
Fethiye	Göcek
Fethiye	Kadıköy
Fethiye	Karaçulha
Fethiye	Karadere
Fethiye	Kemer
Fethiye	Kumluova
Fethiye	Ölüdeniz
Fethiye	Seki
Fethiye	Yeşilüzümlü
Kavaklıdere	Çamlıbel
Kavaklıdere	Çayboyu
Kavaklıdere	Kavaklıdere
Kavaklıdere	Menteşe
Köyceğiz	Beyobası
Köyceğiz	Köyceğiz
Köyceğiz	Toparlar
Marmaris	Armutalan
Marmaris	Beldibi
Marmaris	Bozburun
Marmaris	İçmeler
Marmaris	Marmaris
Marmaris	Turunç
Milas	Bafa
Milas	Beçin
Milas	Güllük
Milas	Milas
Milas	Ören
Milas	Selimiye
Muğla (Merkez)	Bayır
Muğla	Kafaca
Muğla	Muğla
Muğla	Yerkesik
Muğla	Yeşilyurt
Ortaca	Dalyan
Ortaca	Ortaca
Ula	Akyaka
Ula	Gökova
Ula	Ula
Yatağan	Bencik
Yatağan	Bozarmut
Yatağan	Bozüyük
Yatağan	Turgut
Yatağan	Yatağan
Yatağan	Yeşilbağcılar

== Changes in 2014 ==
According to Law act no 6360, belde (town) municipalities within provinces with more than 750,000 population (so called Metropolitan municipalities in Turkey) were abolished on 30 March 2014. 48 belde municipalities in the above list are now defunct. The list is kept for historical reference.
