= Marmaris National Park =

National park in Muğla, Turkey

- Marmaris Milli Parkı
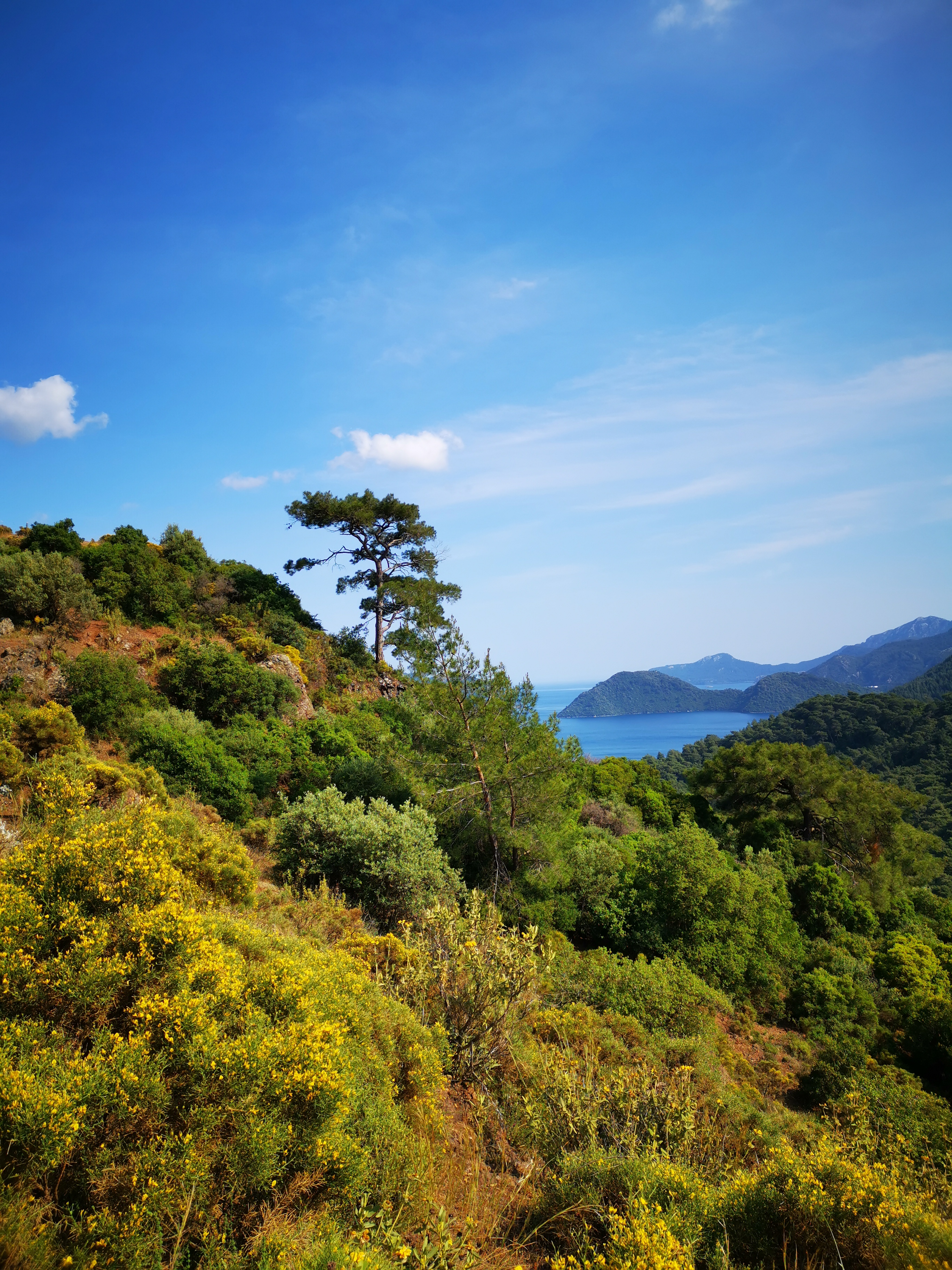
- A view from Marmaris National Park

- Location within Turkey
- Location: Marmaris, Muğla Province, Turkey
- Nearest city: MMuğla
- Coordinates: 36°50′44.83″N 28°17′52.74″E
- Area: 33,350 ha (82,400 acres)
- Established: 30 January 1996
- Visitors: 8.5 million (2021)
- Governing body: Ministry of Forest and Water Management
- Website: www.milliparklar.gov.tr/mp/marmaris/index.htm

Marmaris National Park (Turkish: Marmaris Milli Parkı), established on 30 January 1996, is a national park in southwestern coast of Turkey. The national park is located in Marmaris district of Muğla Province.

== Overview ==
Marmaris National Park was declared with the decision of the Cabinet of Turkey, and announced in the Official Gazette on 30 January 1996. It is situated in Marmaris district of Muğla Province on the southwestern coast of Turkey. It covers an area of 33,350 ha (82,400 acres). Being as part of the""Mediterranean Forests" of the World Wildlife Fund (WWF), it is one of the 200 ecological regions with global priority in terms of nature protection. It is in the "Mediterranean Region", which is one of the 25 hot and important points of the world in terms of marine biodiversity and threat.

In 2021, the number of visitors amounted around 8.5 million.

== Geology ==
The geological structure of the area consists of peridotite and limestones, alluvium and slope debris. The oxidation of Cretaceous aged magmatic rocks (peridotite) outcropping in the northwest of the area has led to red-colored appearances. Limestones outcrop in a wide area in the east of the field. The western part of the limestone outcrops is bedded, while the eastern part is massive.

== Ecosystem ==
=== Flora ===
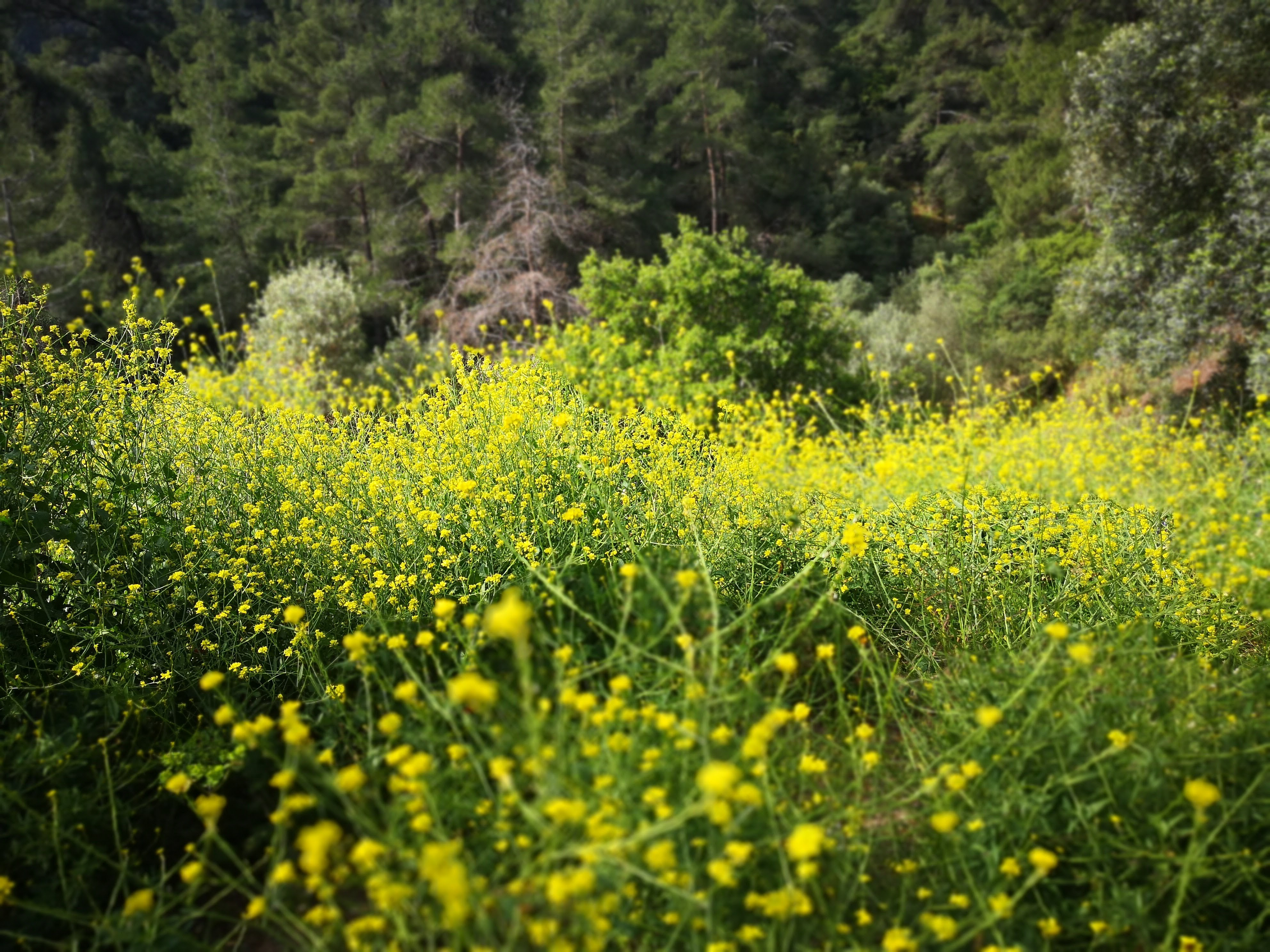
Vegetation in early spring.

The national park's forest formation is composed of Turkish pine (Pinus brutia). Additionally, the endemic species sweetgum tree Liquidambar) spreads in deep, moist and heavily soiled areas. In the valley, Turkish pine, oak, plane tree and alder compose different, mixed and impressive landscape. Tree-shaped Mediterranean plants such as holly oak (Quercus ilex), kermes oak (Quercus coccifera), wild olive (Bontia), Arbutus, bladdernuts (Staphylea), sumac, carob, terebinth (Pistacia terebinthus), oleander (Nerium) and laurel are widely distributed in the national park. Of the 514 plant species identified in the park, 54 are endemic, 9 are locally endemic, 5 are endangered and 74 are rare in terms of danger class.

=== Fauna ===
The park is quite rich in wildlife. In the region between Köyceğiz and Marmaris, mammals, particularly the endangered species wild goat (Capra aegagrus), and bear, caracal, fox, squirrel, weasel, badger, wild boar and rabbit are also found. In the national park, 213 insect species, 35 fish species, 21 mammal species, 29 reptile species, 7 amphibian species and 112 bird species were identified.

== Historical cites ==
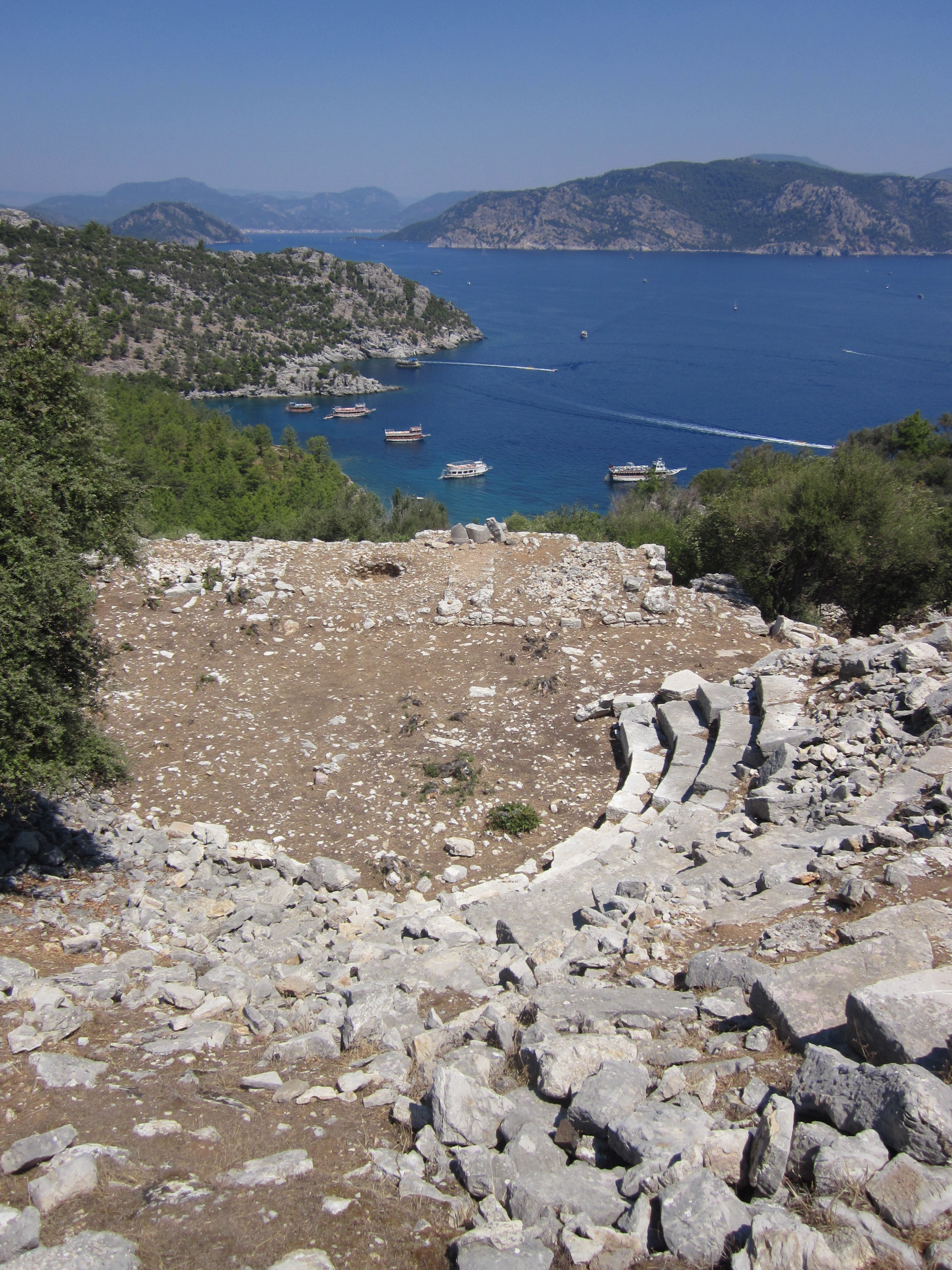
Amphitheatre of Amos.

The region was historically named Caria. Ancient settlements Amos and Physcus are located within the park area. The Caria settlement of Amos is surrounded by city walls, and an amphitheatre, a temple and some statue bases are found in Amos. The ancient city of Physcus, on the other hand, has fortifications built in the Hellenistic period.

== Recreation ==
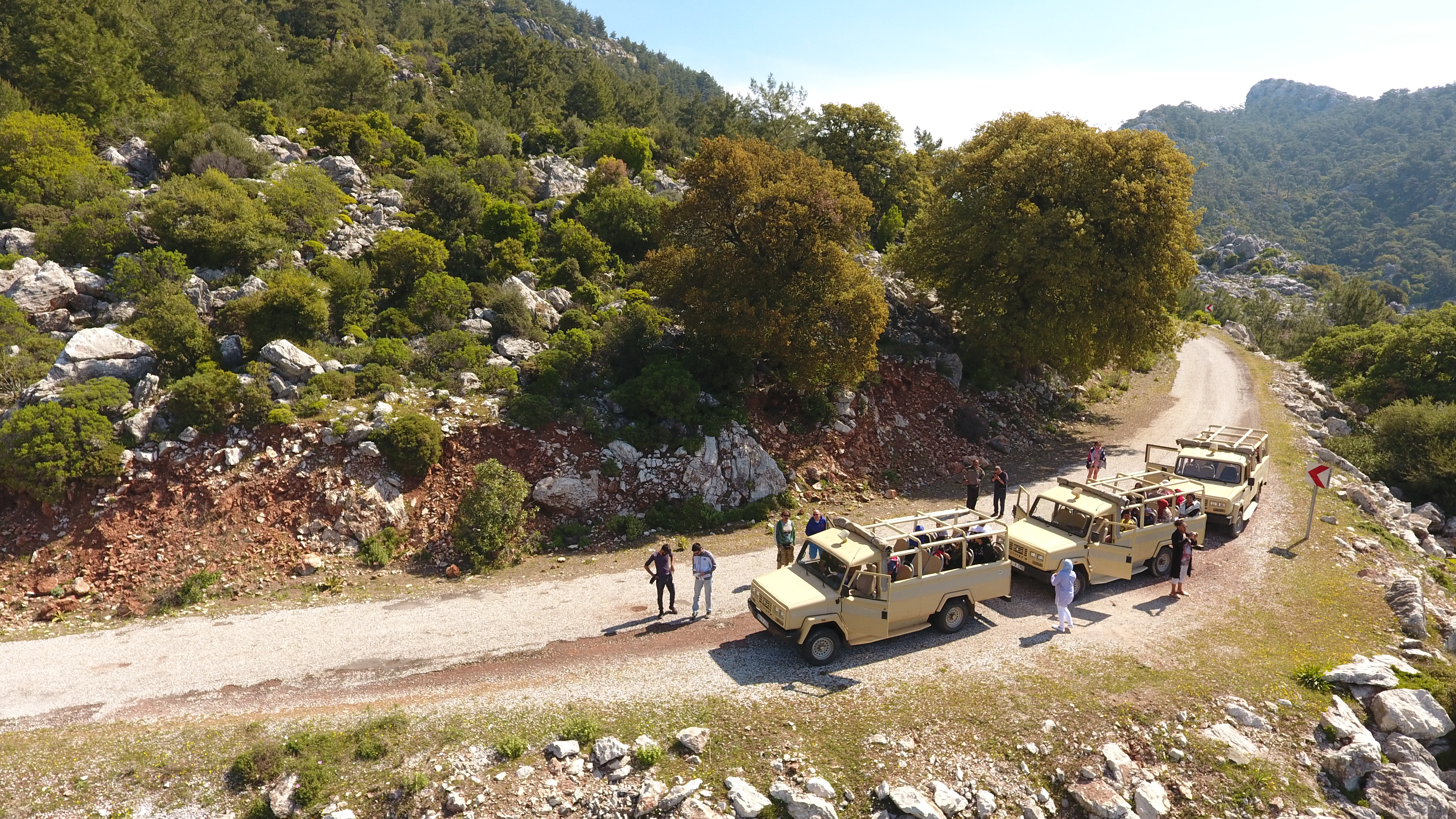
Off-roading in the park.

The national park offers visitors opportunities for various recreational outdoor activities, such as hiking, trekking, mountain biking, botanical tours for endemic plants, rare flowering plants and mushrooms, wildlife observation tours, rock climbing, diving, angling, triathlon and orienteering competitions in the forest.

== Transport ==
The nearest city of Marmaris is 60 km (37 mi) far from Muğla, 89 km (55 mi) from Dalaman Airport and 133 km (83 mi) from Milas–Bodrum Airport. Marmaris can be reached on the highway D-400 (E90) or by sea.
