= Marmaris Dam =

- Location within Turkey
- Country: Turkey
- Location: Marmaris
- Coordinates: 36°56′55″N 28°17′22″E
- Status: Operational
- Construction began: 1998
- Opening date: 2005
- Owner: Turkish State Hydraulic Works

Dam and spillways
- Type of dam: Embankment, concrete-face rock-fill
- Impounds: Kocaalan Creek
- Height (foundation): 74 m (243 ft)
- Height (thalweg): 46 m (151 ft)
- Length: 303 m (994 ft)
- Elevation at crest: 60 m (197 ft)
- Width (crest): 10 m (33 ft)
- Dam volume: 1,300,000 m^{3} (1,700,336 cu yd)
- Spillway type: Chute

Reservoir
- Total capacity: 30,000,000 m^{3} (24,321 acre⋅ft)
- Catchment area: 62.83 km^{2} (24 mi^{2})
- Surface area: 1.77 km^{2} (1 mi^{2})
- Normal elevation: 50.5 m (166 ft)

The Marmaris Dam is a concrete-face rock-fill dam on the Kocaalan Creek located 10 km (6 mi) north of Marmaris in Muğla Province, Turkey. Constructed between 1998 and 2005, the development was backed by the Turkish State Hydraulic Works as a build-operate-transfer project. The primary purpose of the dam is municipal water supply and it provides Marmaris with 22,390,000 m^{3} (18,152 acre⋅ft) of water annually.

== See also ==
- List of dams and reservoirs in Turkey
