= Nimara Cave =

Cave on Heaven Island, Turkey

Coordinates: 36.813°N 28.297°E

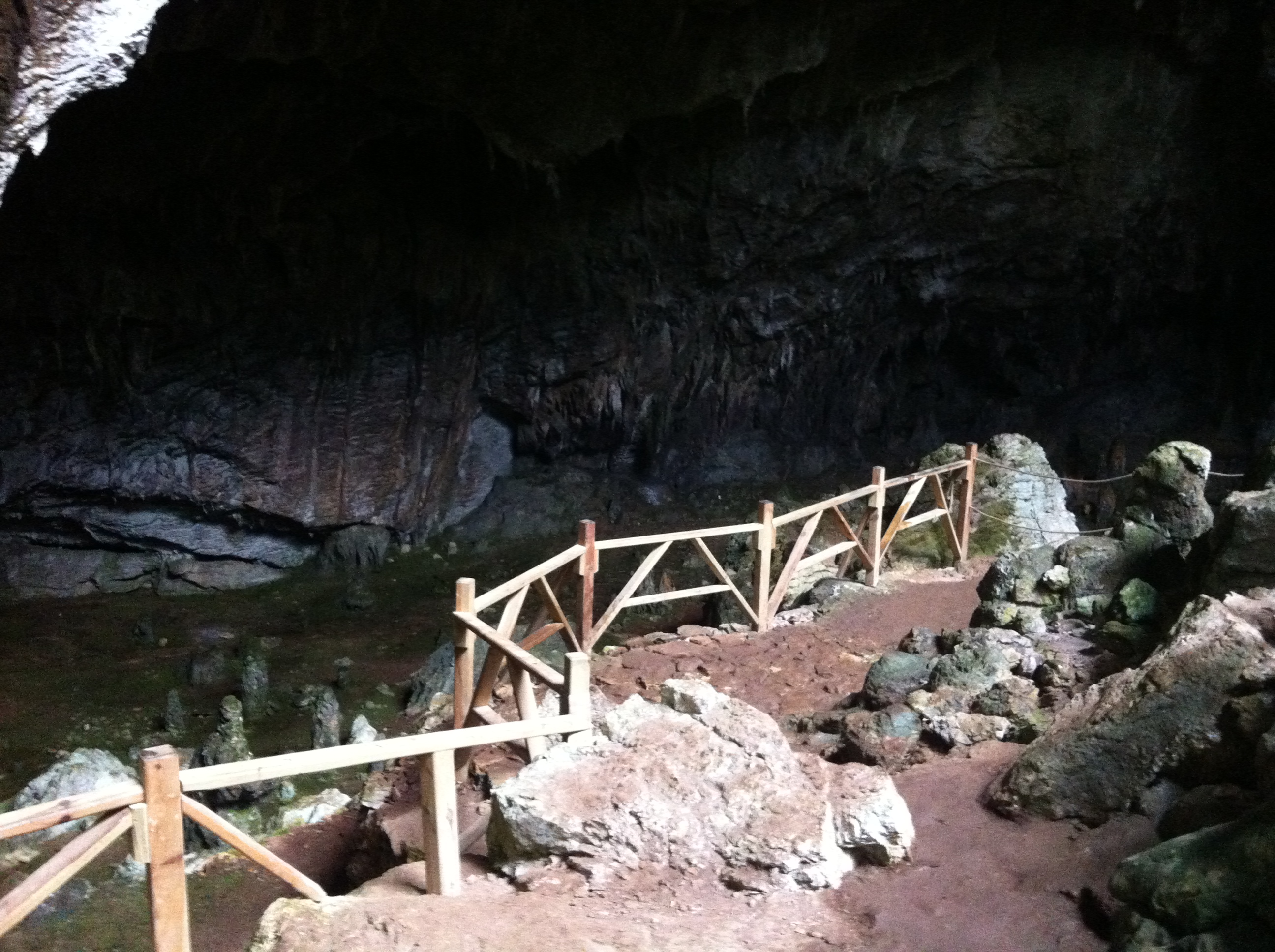
Nimara Cave, Heaven Island

Nimara Cave is a cave on Heaven Island.

== Human presence ==
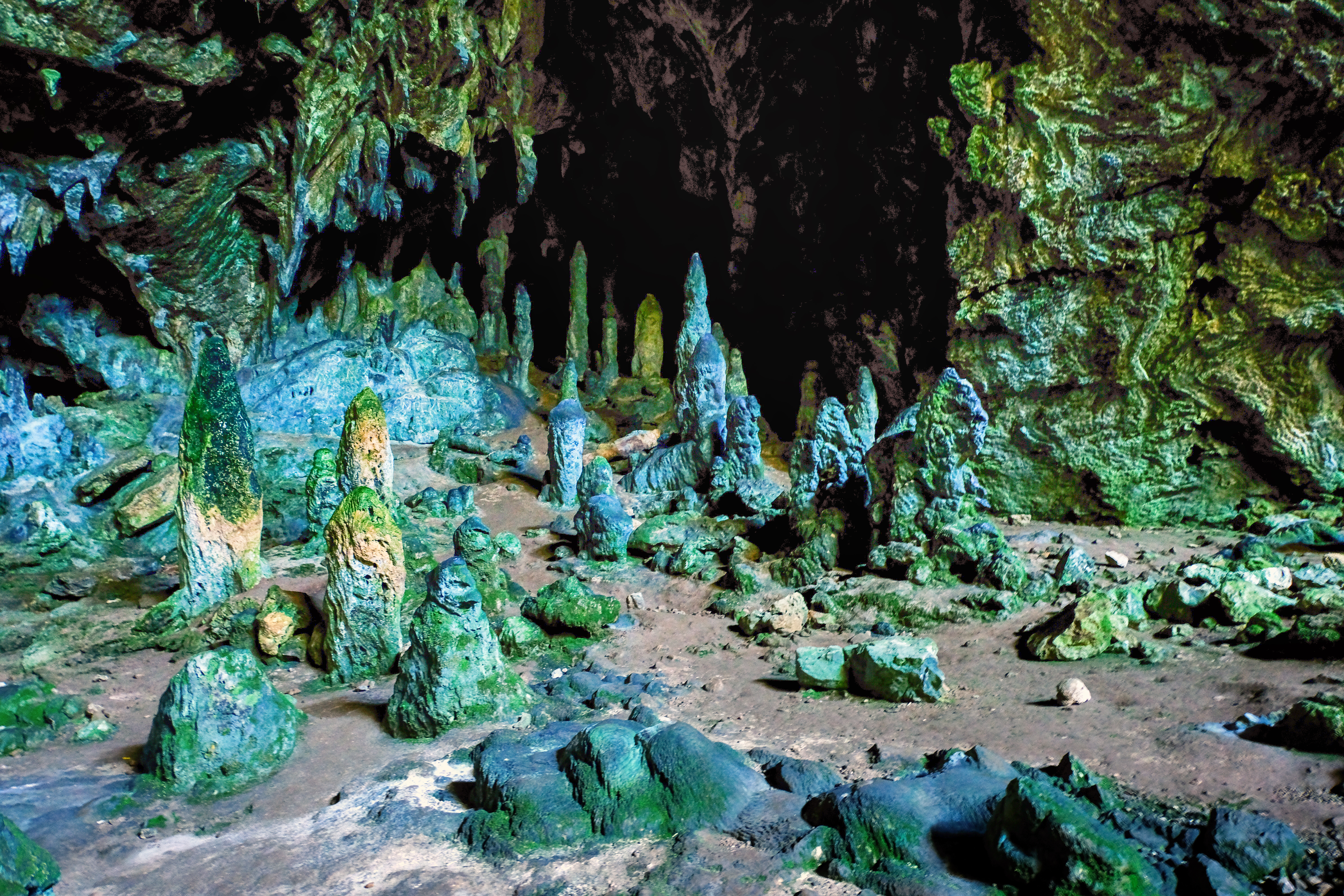

Since ancient times, the cave was used as a place of worship. According to the writings of ancient Greek historian Herodotus, human presence in the cave (as well as the old city of Physkos, today called Marmaris), dates back to 3,000 BC. However, excavations carried out by the Municipality of Marmaris in 2007 extended this period to almost 12,000 years back.

== External links and references ==
- Marmarisinfo
