= Osmaniye, Marmaris =

Village in Turkey

Osmaniye
- Neighbourhood
- Location in Turkey Osmaniye (Turkey Aegean)
- Coordinates: 36°45′33″N 28°12′21″E
- Country: Turkey
- Province: Muğla
- District: Marmaris
- Population (2024): 484
- Time zone: UTC+3 (TRT)

Osmaniye is a neighbourhood in the municipality and district of Marmaris, Muğla Province, Turkey. Its population is 484 (2024).
