= Tepe, Marmaris =

Village in Turkey

Tepe
- Neighbourhood
- Location in Turkey Tepe (Turkey Aegean)
- Coordinates: 36°51′22″N 28°16′20″E
- Country: Turkey
- Province: Muğla
- District: Marmaris
- Population (2024): 6,785
- Time zone: UTC+3 (TRT)

Tepe is a neighbourhood in the municipality and district of Marmaris, Muğla Province, Turkey. Its population is 6,785 (2024).
