= Heaven Island =

Peninsula near Marmaris, Turkey

Coordinates: 36.804°N 28.288°E

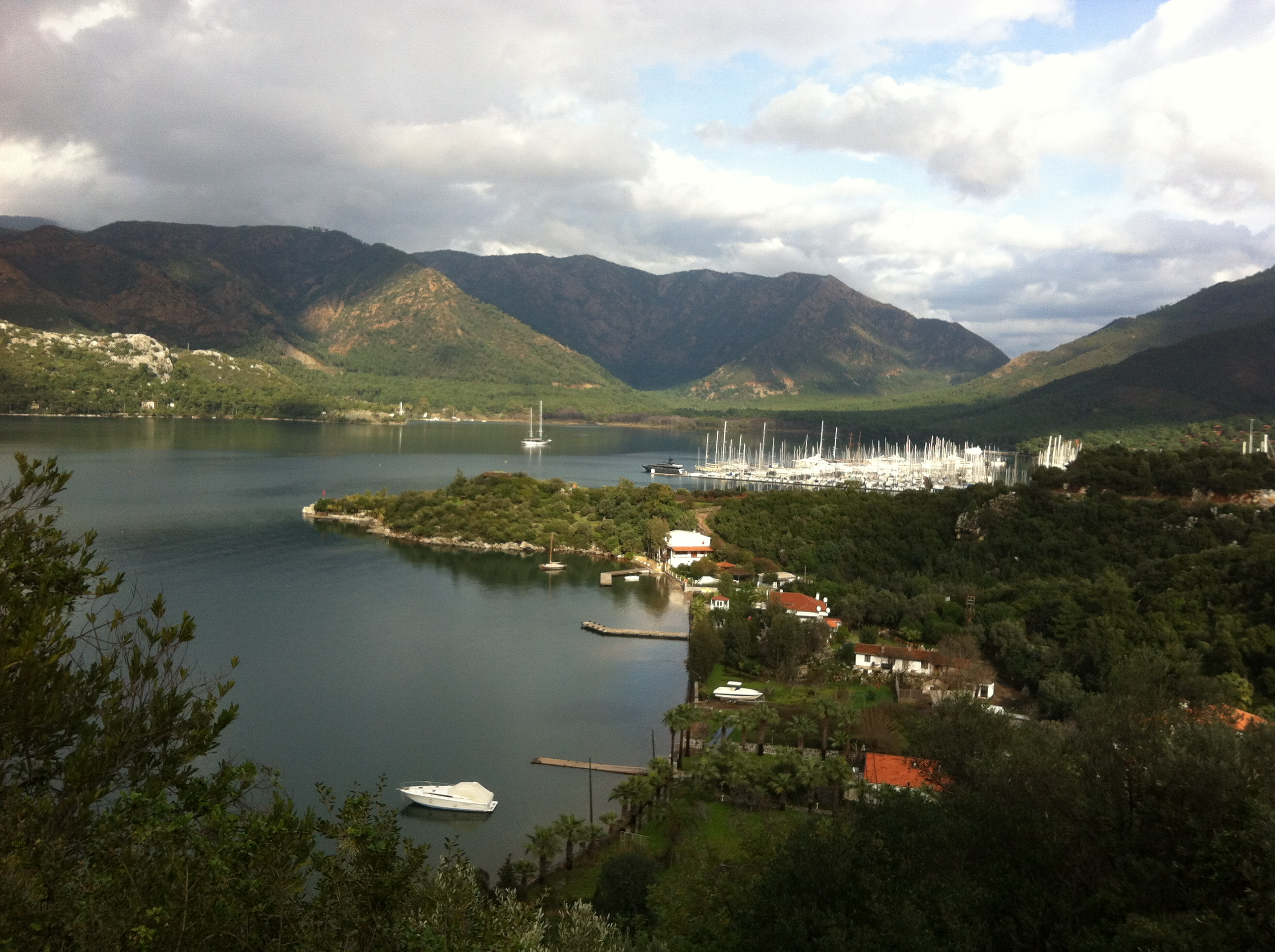
Heaven Island, near Marmaris, Turkey.

Heaven Island (Turkish: Cennet Adası, also known as Paradise Island or the Nimara Peninsula) is a peninsula near the city of Marmaris, Turkey.

Heaven Island is situated about 8 km from Marmaris, and is connected with the mainland by an isthmus known as the Fake Strait (Turkish: Yalancı Boğazı). The region has been officially recognized for its natural and archeological heritage and brought under protection for both its natural and archeological values.

The Marmaris bay used to be a place of safe harbour for various naval fleets. the opposing forces of the Ottoman and Persian military has naval bases in the bay. At one stage it is thought that ships from both sides were anchored here at the same time separated by a small otherwise un-inhabited island.

== Ancient human presence ==
The remnants of archeological importance are located at the highest point of the island and these belong to one of the three branches of ancient settlements around Marmaris. This place can be reached by taking a hiking adventure for about an hour from Marmaris. The place has remnants of the ancient city wall, the watch tower and ancient houses.

== Flora and fauna ==
The area has a wide variety of plant and animal life and continues to thrive on the protection offered to this place. Nimara Cave is home to trogloxene butterflies, similar to those living in Fethiye's Butterfly Valley (Turkish: Kelebekler Vadisi).

== Nimara Cave ==
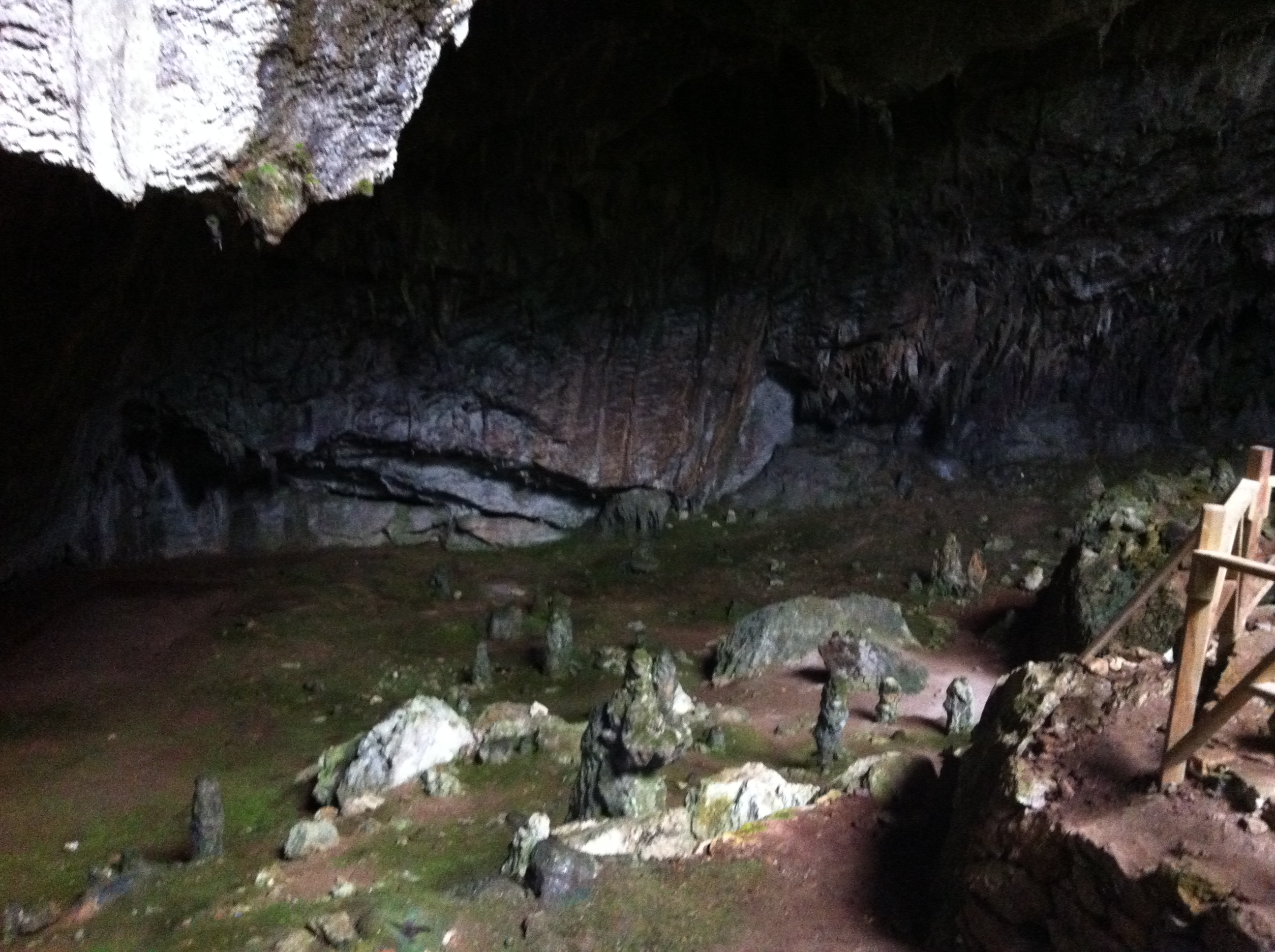
Interior of Nimara Cave.

The Nimara Cave, situated on the island, has become a popular tourist attraction. The place is of special interest for students and researchers involved in research work about the ancient human settlements in and around Muğla. The Marmaris Museum Directorate and the City Municipality of Marmaris have been making special efforts to preserve the archeological heritage of this place and at the same time to popularize the place with visitors in and around Marmaris.

The cave was declared a protected area in 1999.
