= Bayırköy, Marmaris =

Village in Turkey

Bayırköy
- Neighbourhood
- Location in Turkey Bayırköy (Turkey Aegean)
- Coordinates: 36°42′51″N 28°10′46″E
- Country: Turkey
- Province: Muğla
- District: Marmaris
- Population (2024): 633
- Time zone: UTC+3 (TRT)

Bayırköy is a neighbourhood in the municipality and district of Marmaris, Muğla Province, Turkey. Its population is 633 (2024).
