= Söğütköy, Marmaris =

Village in Turkey

Söğütköy
- Neighbourhood
- Location within Turkey Location within Turkey Aegean
- Coordinates: 36°39′47″N 28°06′07″E
- Country: Turkey
- Province: Muğla
- District: Marmaris
- Population (2024): 1,816
- Time zone: UTC+3 (TRT)

Söğütköy is a neighbourhood in the municipality and district of Marmaris, Muğla Province, Turkey. Its population is 1,816 (2024).
