= Siteler, Marmaris =

Village in Turkey

Siteler
- Neighbourhood
- Location in Turkey Siteler (Turkey Aegean)
- Coordinates: 36°50′12″N 28°14′40″E
- Country: Turkey
- Province: Muğla
- District: Marmaris
- Population (2024): 6,644
- Time zone: UTC+3 (TRT)

Siteler is a neighbourhood in the municipality and district of Marmaris, Muğla Province, Turkey. Its population is 6,644 (2024).
