= Çıldır, Marmaris =

Village in Turkey

Çıldır
- Neighbourhood
- Location in Turkey Çıldır (Turkey Aegean)
- Coordinates: 36°51′00″N 28°15′34″E
- Country: Turkey
- Province: Muğla
- District: Marmaris
- Population (2024): 6,472
- Time zone: UTC+3 (TRT)

Çıldır is a neighbourhood in the municipality and district of Marmaris, Muğla Province, Turkey. Its population is 6,472 (2024).
