= Marmaris Castle =

Castle in Marmaris, Turkey

Coordinates: 36°51′2″N 28°16′28″E

- Muğla province, Turkey
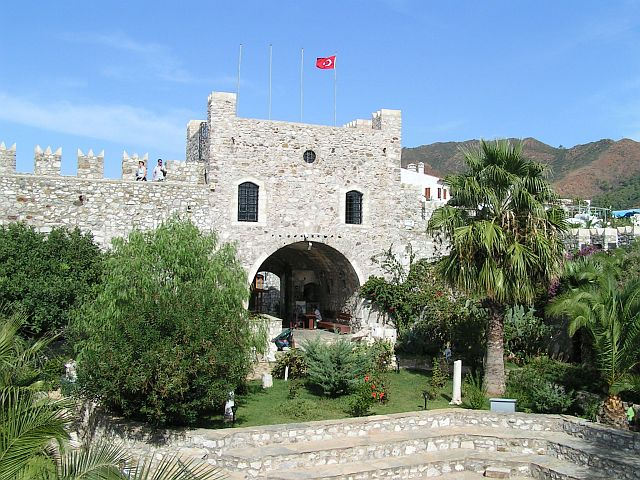

Site information
- Type: Castle

Marmaris Castle is located in Marmaris, Turkey. The castle was reconstructed by Suleiman the Magnificent during his expedition against Rhodes. The fort is one of the few castles in Turkey that also possesses a museum.

According to Greek historian Herodotus, the first city walls in Marmaris were constructed in 3,000 BC, although the only known written source about the construction of the castle is by the renowned Ottoman traveler, Evliya Çelebi, in his work Seyahatname. Çelebi, who visited Muğla and its vicinity in the 17th century, says that Sultan Suleiman ordered the construction of the castle before his expedition to Rhodes and that the castle served as a military base for the Ottoman Army during the expedition.

An important part of the castle was destroyed during World War I by a French warship. The 1957 Fethiye earthquakes almost completely destroyed the city. Only the castle and the historic buildings surrounding the fortress were left undamaged. Until 1979, locals inhabited the castle, which is known to include 18 residences, a fountain and a cistern. Since 1979, renovation work has been continuing at the castle.

The fort was registered as a monumental structure in 1983 and opened as a museum in 1991.
