= Hatipirimi, Marmaris =

Village in Turkey

Hatipirimi
- Neighbourhood
- Location in Turkey Hatipirimi (Turkey Aegean)
- Coordinates: 36°51′14″N 28°15′22″E
- Country: Turkey
- Province: Muğla
- District: Marmaris
- Population (2024): 3,833
- Time zone: UTC+3 (TRT)

Hatipirimi is a neighbourhood in the municipality and district of Marmaris, Muğla Province, Turkey. Its population is 3,833 (2024).
