= Kemeraltı, Marmaris =

Village in Turkey

Kemeraltı
- Neighbourhood
- Location in Turkey Kemeraltı (Turkey Aegean)
- Coordinates: 36°51′21″N 28°15′58″E
- Country: Turkey
- Province: Muğla
- District: Marmaris
- Population (2024): 6,905
- Time zone: UTC+3 (TRT)

Kemeraltı is a neighbourhood in the municipality and district of Marmaris, Muğla Province, Turkey. Its population is 6,905 (2024).
