= Sarıana, Marmaris =

Village in Turkey

Sarıana
- Neighbourhood
- Location in Turkey Sarıana (Turkey Aegean)
- Coordinates: 36°51′24″N 28°16′37″E
- Country: Turkey
- Province: Muğla
- District: Marmaris
- Population (2024): 4,355
- Time zone: UTC+3 (TRT)

Sarıana is a neighbourhood in the municipality and district of Marmaris, Muğla Province, Turkey. Its population is 4,355 (2024).
