= Bozburun =

- Neighbourhood
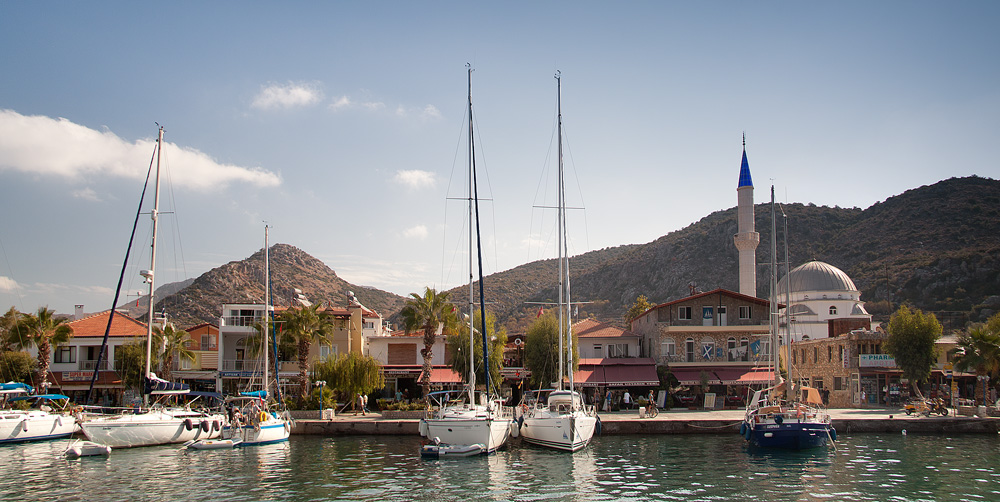
- Bozburun harbour

- Location within Turkey Location within Turkey Aegean
- Coordinates: 36°41′N 28°04′E
- Country: Turkey
- Province: Muğla
- District: Marmaris
- Population (2022): 2,238
- Time zone: UTC+3 (TRT)
- Postal code: 48700
- Area code: 0252

Bozburun is a neighbourhood of the municipality and district of Marmaris, Muğla Province, Turkey. Its population is 2,238 (2022). Before the 2013 reorganisation, it was a town (belde). It is situated on the coast of the peninsula of the same name (Bozburun Peninsula) which extends in parallel to Datça Peninsula in the south. The town faces across the sea the town of Datça and the Greek island of Symi (Sömbeki in Turkish)

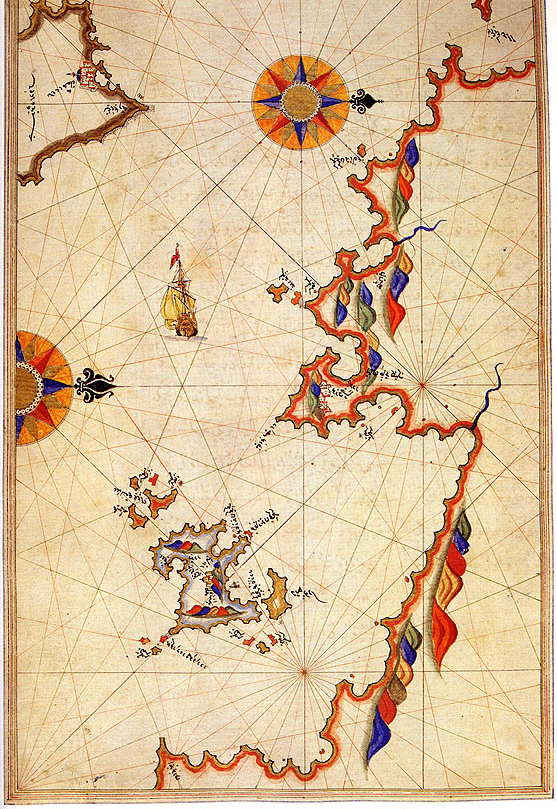
Bozburun in a Piri Reis map

Although quieter than Marmaris bay's two tourist centres (Marmaris and İçmeler), Bozburun is reached by a road about 40 km (25 mi) further from Marmaris. Tourism, fishing, sponge diving and apiculture are the main means of livelihood for its inhabitants. Its thyme honey is famous across Turkey. It has a small harbour, which is also one of the key stops on the popular nautical tourism route of Blue Cruise. Its sea is surrounded by coves. Bozburun is also known in the region for its construction of gulets, on a par with Bodrum and Güllük.

In ancient times, Bozburun region was famous for its marble quarries, which is at the origin of one of the explanations given for the name Marmaris. The quarries were in activity until the times of the 19th century traveller Charles Texier who mentions them. Marble has been a very important export product for the entire region of present-day Muğla Province since ages, with rich reserves starting from ancient Knidos at the tip of Datça Peninsula to inland Kavaklıdere's modern installations in full activity in our day. There are no quarries in Bozburun presently, but research is being pursued, sometimes also by referring to historic documents and traces, to locate them.

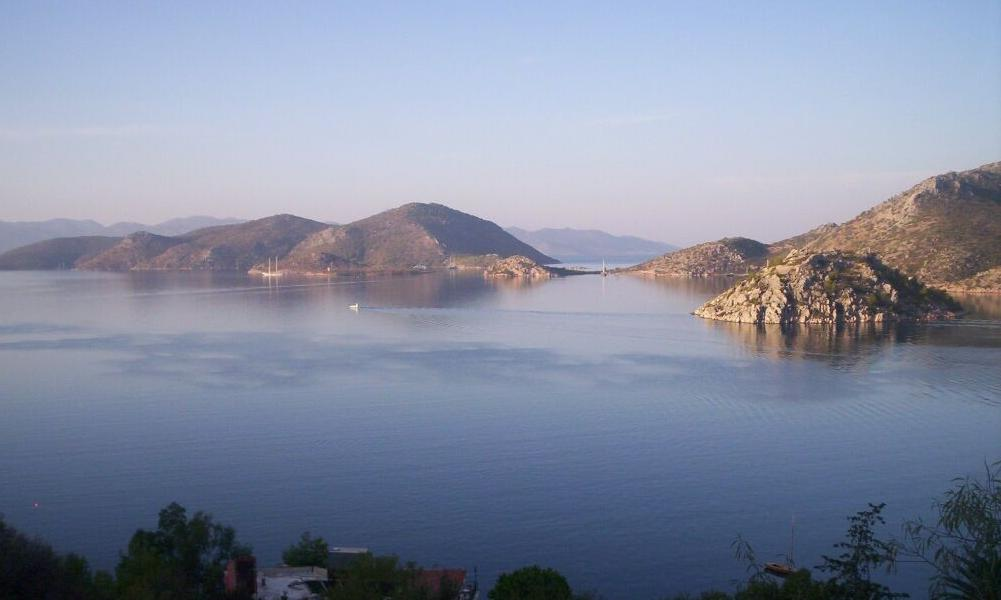
General view of Bozburun Bay

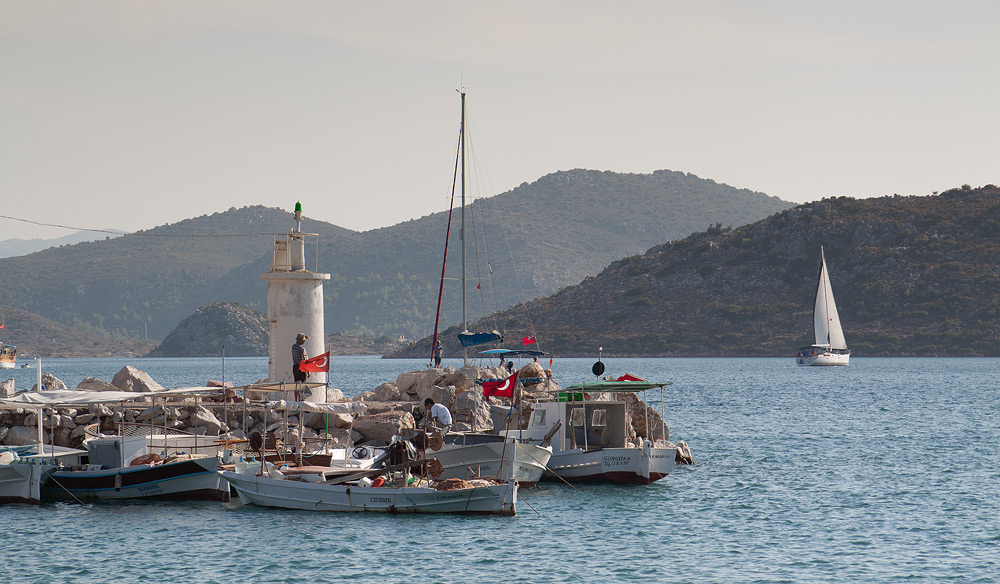

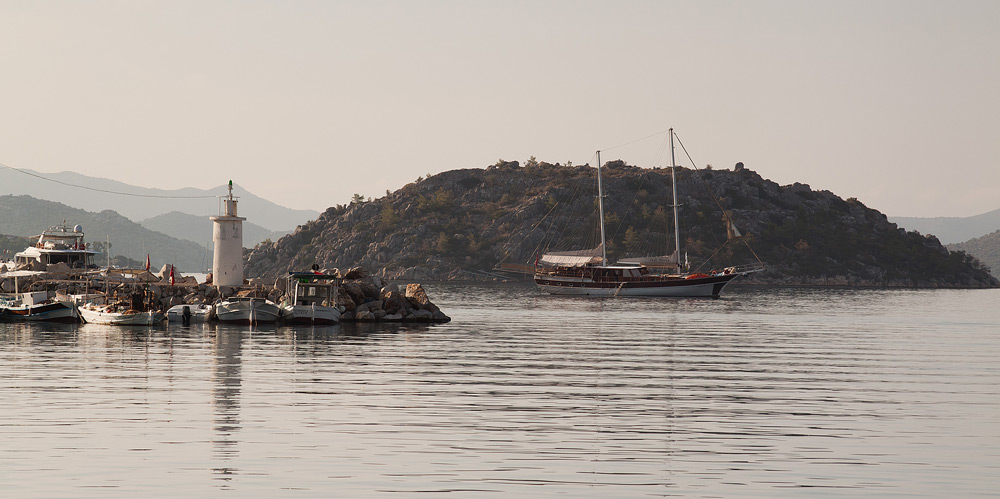

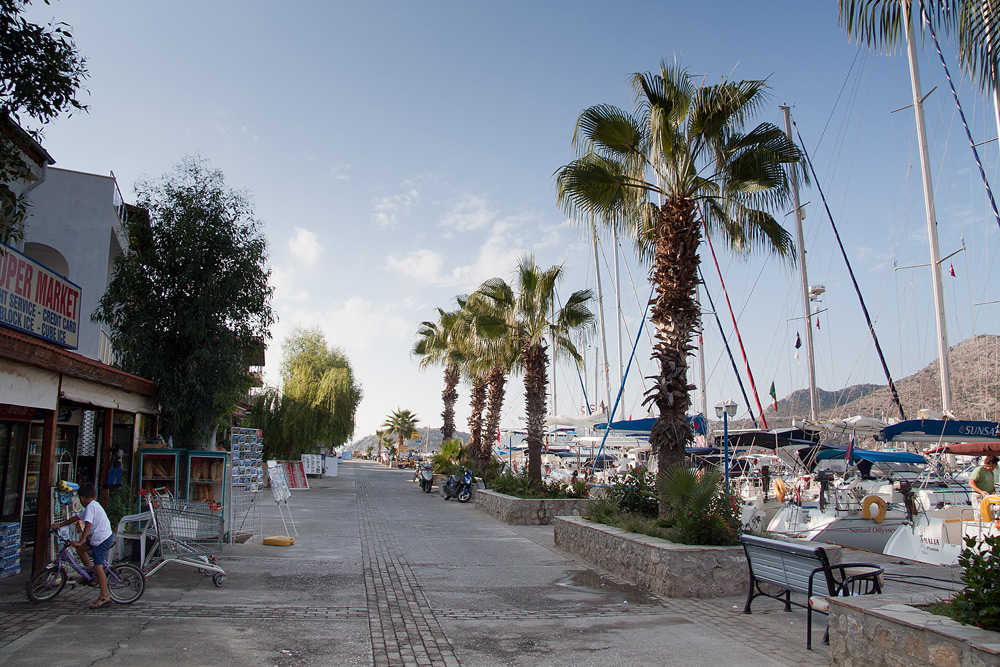

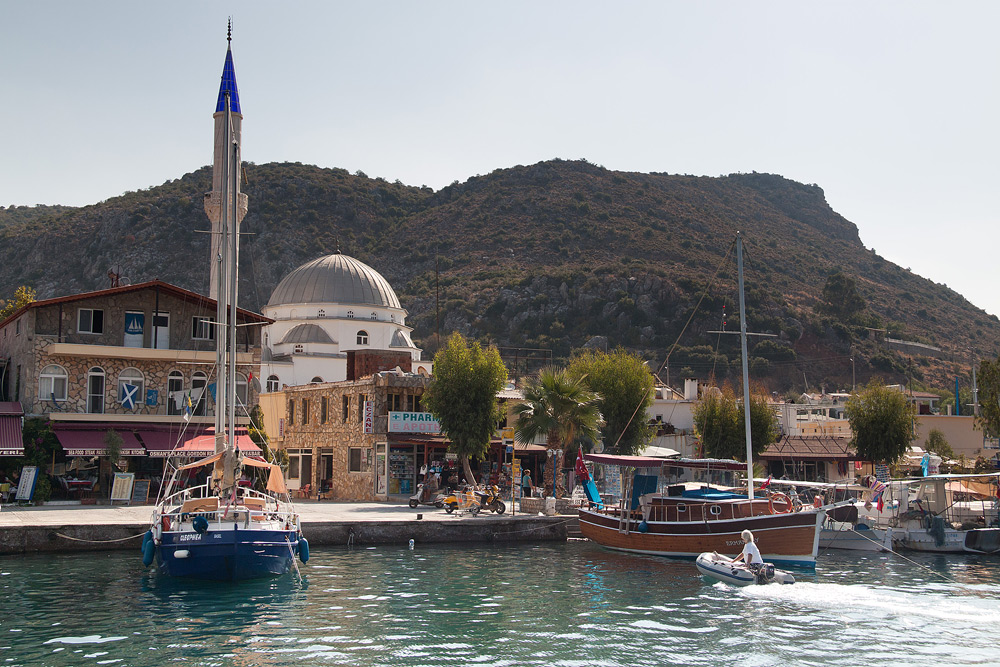

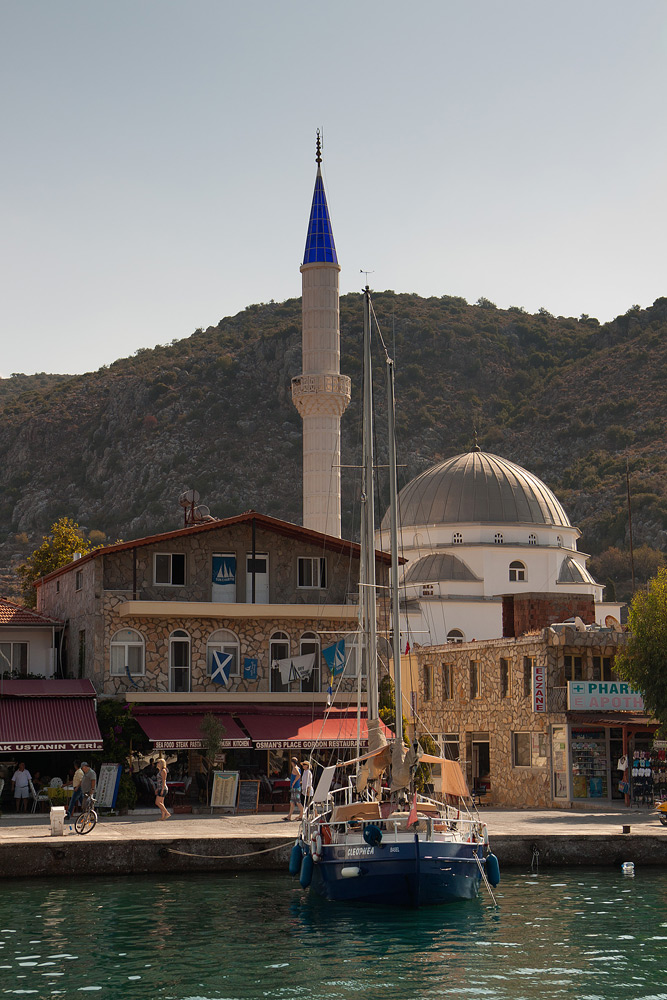

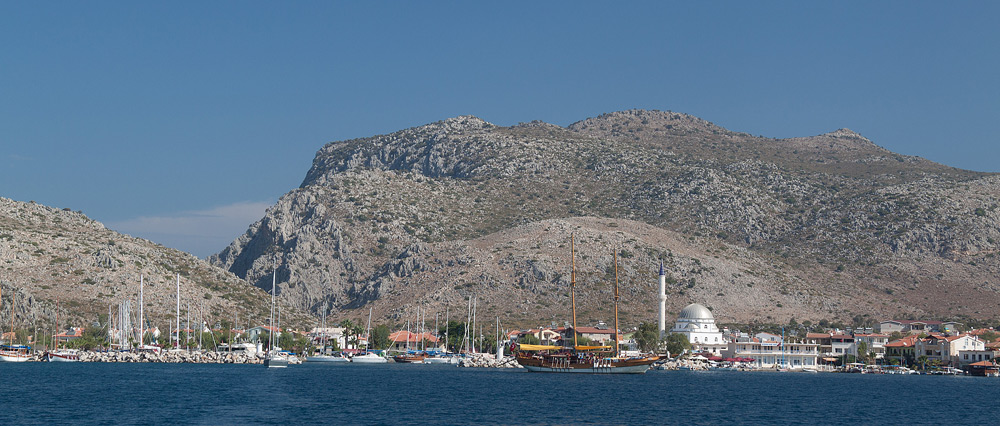

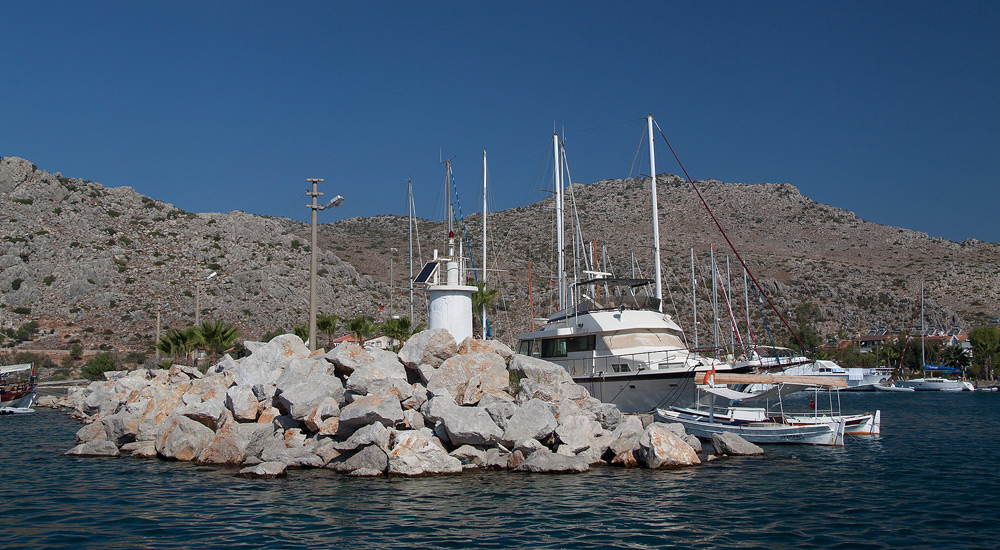

== See also ==
- Turkish Riviera
- Blue Cruise
- Marinas in Turkey
- Foreign purchases of real estate in Turkey
