= Çamdibi, Marmaris =

Village in Turkey

Çamdibi
- Neighbourhood
- Location in Turkey Çamdibi (Turkey Aegean)
- Coordinates: 36°51′44″N 28°15′58″E
- Country: Turkey
- Province: Muğla
- District: Marmaris
- Population (2024): 3,695
- Time zone: UTC+3 (TRT)

Çamdibi is a neighbourhood in the municipality and district of Marmaris, Muğla Province, Turkey. Its population is 3,695 (2024).
