= Turgutköy, Marmaris =

Village in Turkey

Turgutköy
- Neighbourhood
- Location in Turkey Turgutköy (Turkey Aegean)
- Coordinates: 36°44′54″N 28°07′05″E
- Country: Turkey
- Province: Muğla
- District: Marmaris
- Population (2024): 800
- Time zone: UTC+3 (TRT)

Turgutköy is a neighbourhood in the municipality and district of Marmaris, Muğla Province, Turkey. Its population is 800 (2024).
