= Turunç =

- Neighbourhood
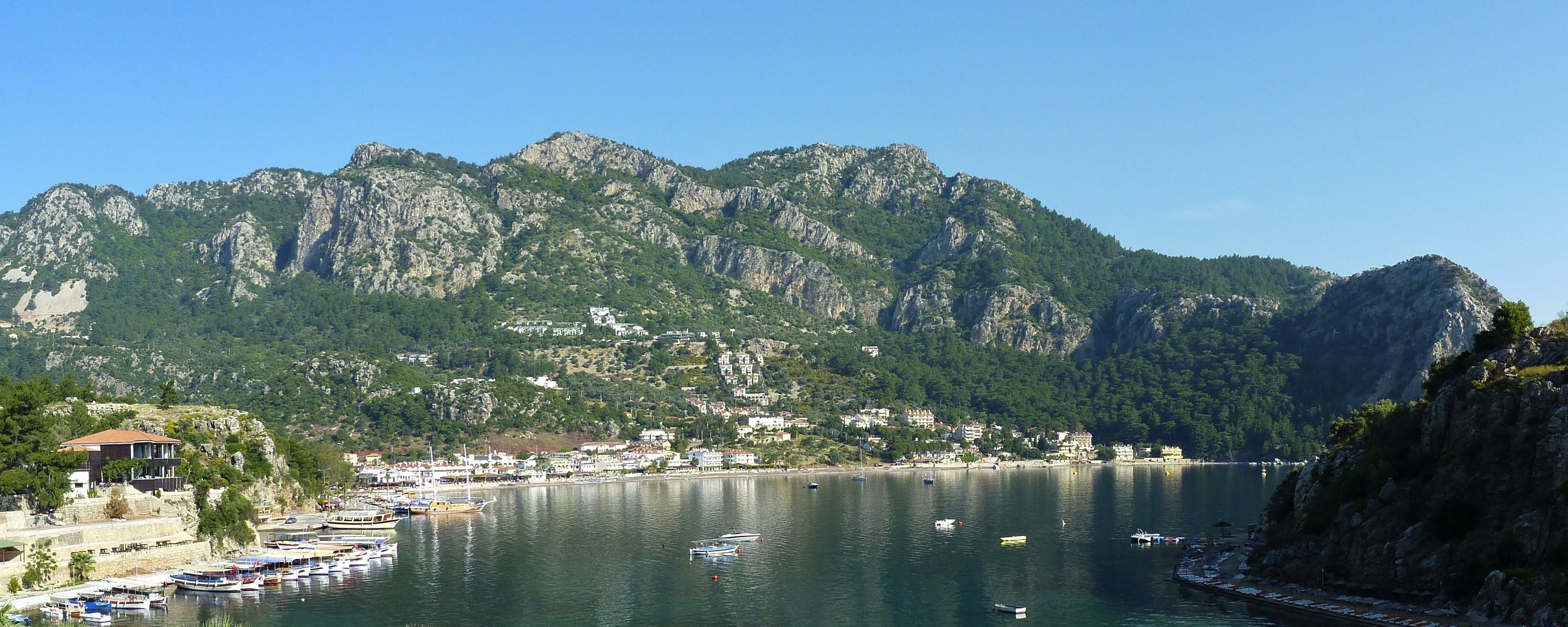
- Panorama of Turunç

- Location within Turkey Location within Turkey Aegean
- Coordinates: 36.773°N 28.246°E
- Country: Turkey
- Province: Muğla
- District: Marmaris
- Population (2022): 1,939
- Time zone: UTC+3 (TRT)
- Postal code: 48700

Turunç is a neighbourhood of the municipality and district of Marmaris, Muğla Province, Turkey. Its population is 1,939 (2022). Before the 2013 reorganisation, it was a town (belde). It is a holiday resort on the Mediterranean Sea coast.

It is located 20 km (12 mi) south of Marmaris, surrounded by the Taurus Mountains. The area is a former fishing village, and has been populated since ancient times as the sea offers a variety of precious resources. Despite the region's fast development in recent years, the natural environment of Turunç has been preserved. As a resort, the village has won the Blue Flag award in recognition of its clean beach and water quality. The size of Turunç is about 1 km (0.62 mi), taking half an hour to walk from one side to the other. The waterfront features restaurants, bazaars and bars. However, due to the nature of the resort there are few exclusively adult establishments.

The climate is warm, and enables the tourist season to be 7 months a year from April to October.

== Infrastructure ==
The closest airport is Dalaman Airport. It is 120 km (75 mi) east of Turunç. The Adnan Menderes Airport of İzmir is 270 km (170 mi) north of the town.

The road to the town passes through the Taurus Mountains, and has a very low speed limit. To reach Turunç from Marmaris is about 20 minutes by car.

Nearby cities include İçmeler and Marmaris, both of which are popular with holidaymakers.
