= Armutalan =

- Neighbourhood
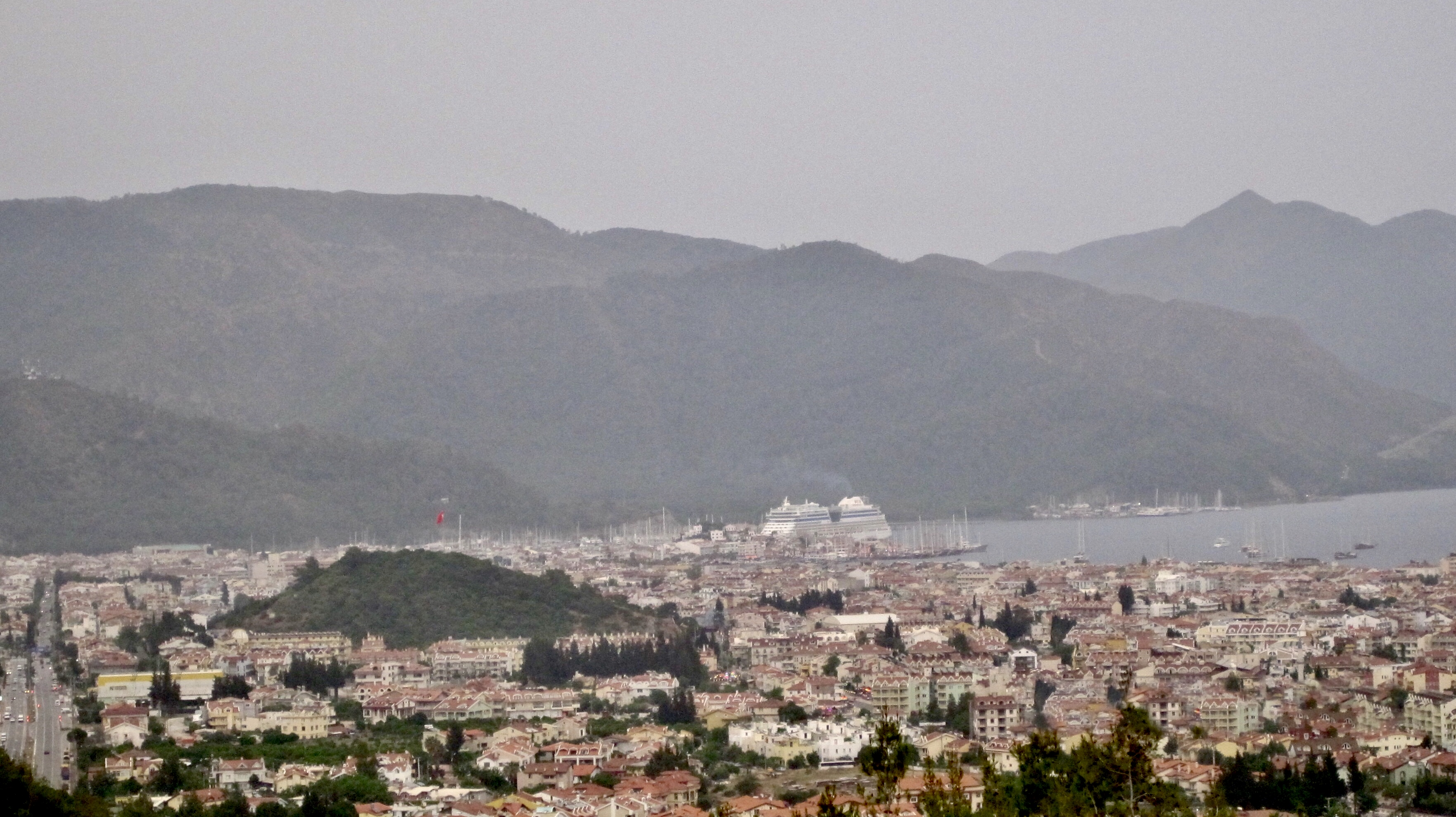
- Marmaris in May 2010

- Location within Turkey Location within Turkey Aegean
- Coordinates: 36°51′N 28°14′E
- Country: Turkey
- Province: Muğla
- District: Marmaris
- Elevation: 25 m (82 ft)
- Population (2022): 23,636
- Time zone: UTC+3 (TRT)
- Postal code: 48700
- Area code: 0252

Armutalan is a neighbourhood of the municipality and district of Marmaris, Muğla Province, Turkey. Its population is 23,636 (2022). Before the 2013 reorganisation, it was a town (belde). It is merged to Marmaris to the southeast. The distance to Muğla is 49 kilometres (30 mi). Up to recent times Armutalan was a small settlement. Being very close to Marmaris, an important touristic center, it flourished and was made a seat of township in 1987.
