= Beldibi, Muğla =

Beldibi
- Neighbourhood
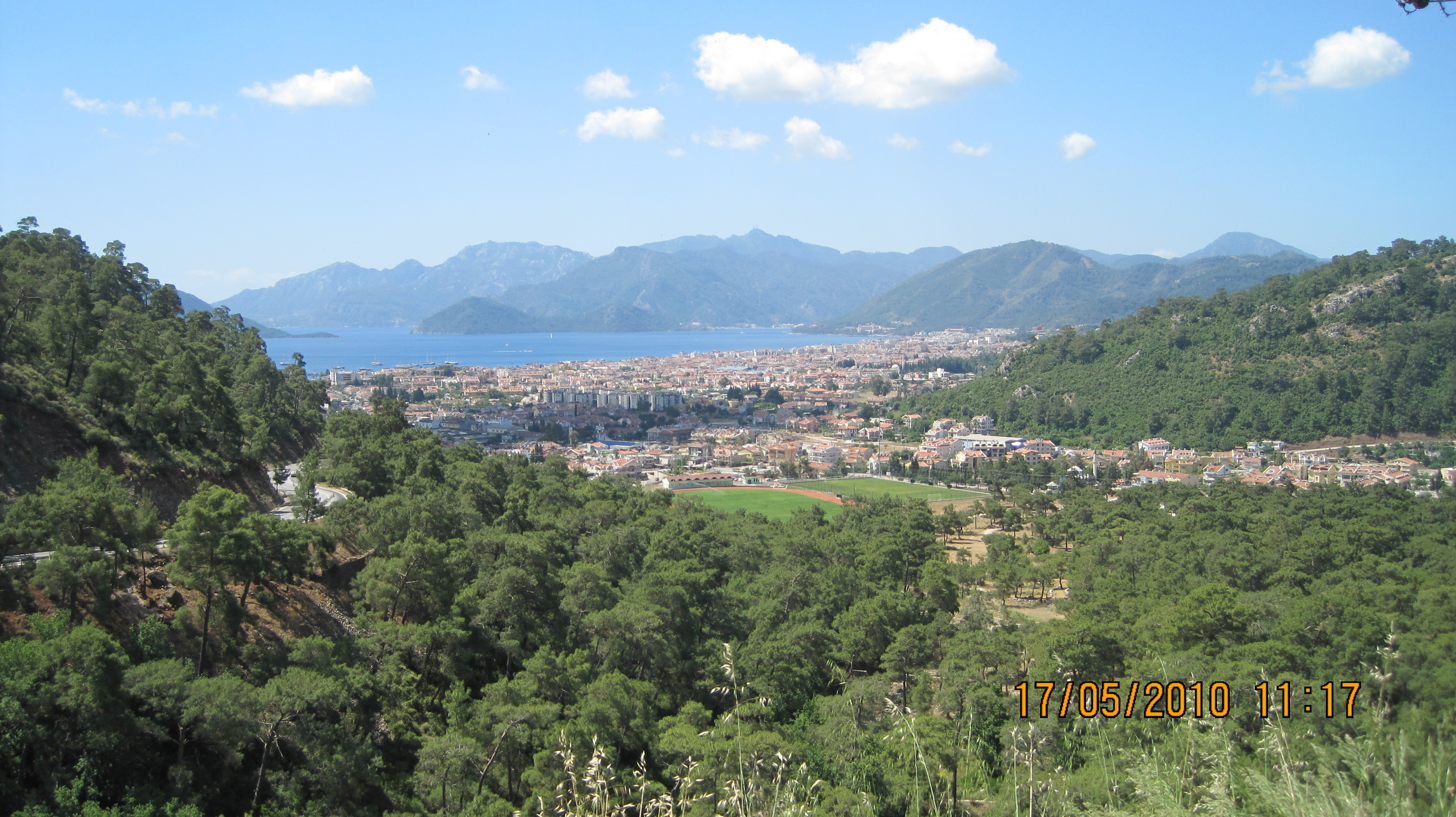

- Location within Turkey Location within Turkey Aegean
- Coordinates: 36°52′N 28°16′E
- Country: Turkey
- Province: Muğla
- District: Marmaris
- Elevation: 415 m (1,362 ft)
- Population (2022): 11,278
- Time zone: UTC+3 (TRT)
- Postal code: 48700
- Area code: 0252

Beldibi is a neighbourhood of the municipality and district of Marmaris, Muğla Province, Turkey. Its population is 11,278 (2022). Before the 2013 reorganisation, it was a town (belde). It is situated in Marmaris national park. It is on Turkish state highway D.400 and merged to Marmaris. Its distance to Muğla is 47 kilometres (29 mi). According to statistics during the last 25 years the population has increased 10 fold. Beldibi flourished especially after 1995 and in 1999 it was declared as a seat of township. Being merged to Marmaris some residents of the town work in touristic facilities and other urban services. Beehiving is another profitable sector.
