= Marmaris =

- District and municipality
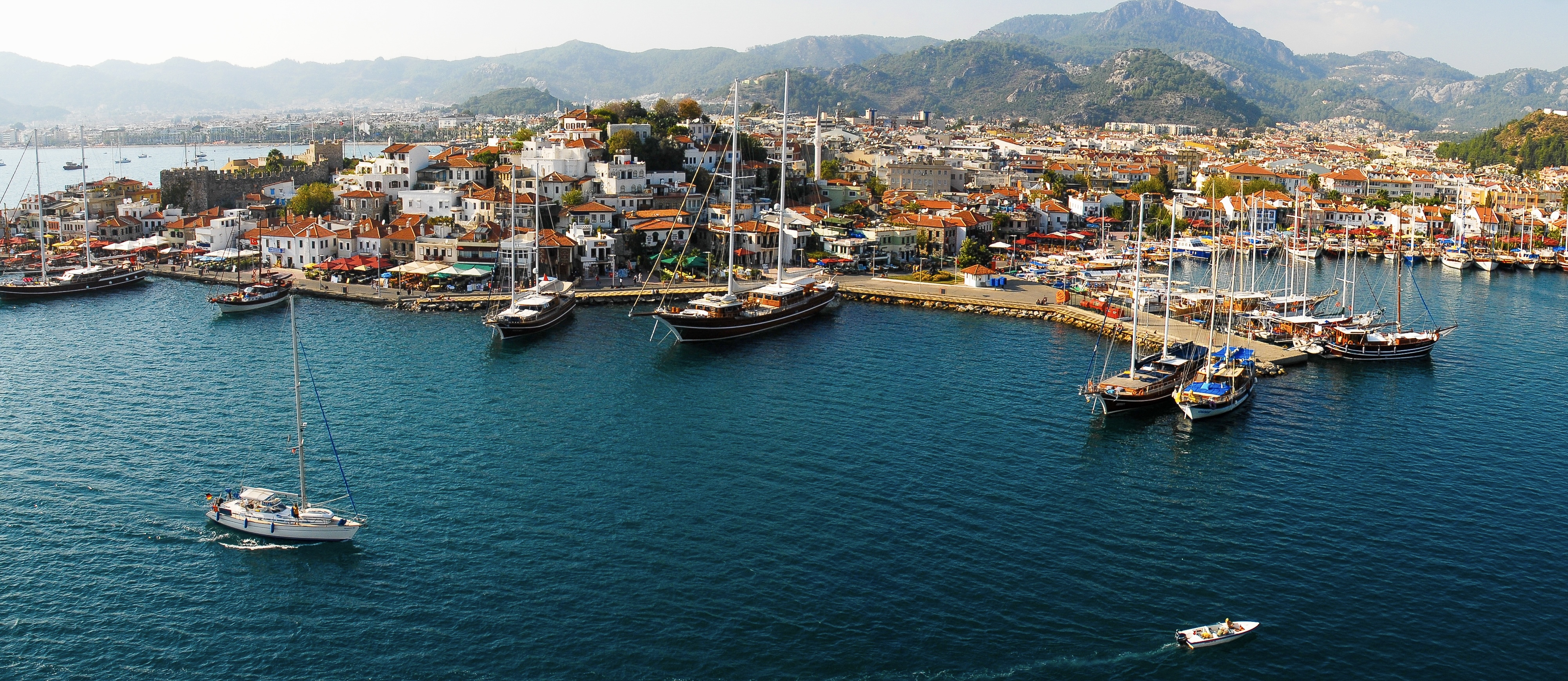
- Marmaris harbour

- Logo

- Map showing Marmaris District in Muğla Province

- Location within Turkey Location within Turkey Aegean
- Coordinates: 36°51′12″N 28°16′15″E
- Country: Turkey
- Province: Muğla

Government
  - Mayor: Acar Ünlü (CHP)
- Area: 906 km^{2} (350 sq mi)
- Elevation: 7 m (23 ft)
- Population (2022): 97,818
  - Density: 108/km^{2} (280/sq mi)
- Time zone: UTC+3 (TRT)
- Postal code: 48700
- Area code: 0252
- Website: www.marmaris.bel.tr

Marmaris (Turkish pronunciation: [ˈmaɾmaɾis]) is a municipality and district of Muğla Province, Turkey. Its area is 906 km^{2}, and its population is 97,818 (2022). It is a port city and tourist resort on the Mediterranean coast, along the shoreline of the Turkish Riviera.

Although Marmaris is known for its honey, its main source of income is international tourism. It is located between two intersecting sets of mountains by the sea, though following a construction boom in the 1980s, little is left of the sleepy fishing village that Marmaris was until the late 20th century.

As an adjunct to the tourism industry, Marmaris is also a centre for sailing and diving, possessing two major and several smaller marinas. It is a popular wintering location for hundreds of cruising boaters.

Dalaman Airport is an hour's drive to the east.

Ferries operate from Marmaris to Rhodes and Symi in Greece.

== Etymology ==
During the period of the Beylik of Menteşe; the city became known as Marmaris, a name derived from the Greek màrmaron (marble; Turkish: mermer), in reference to the rich marble deposits in the region, and the prominent role of the city's port in the marble trade.

== History ==
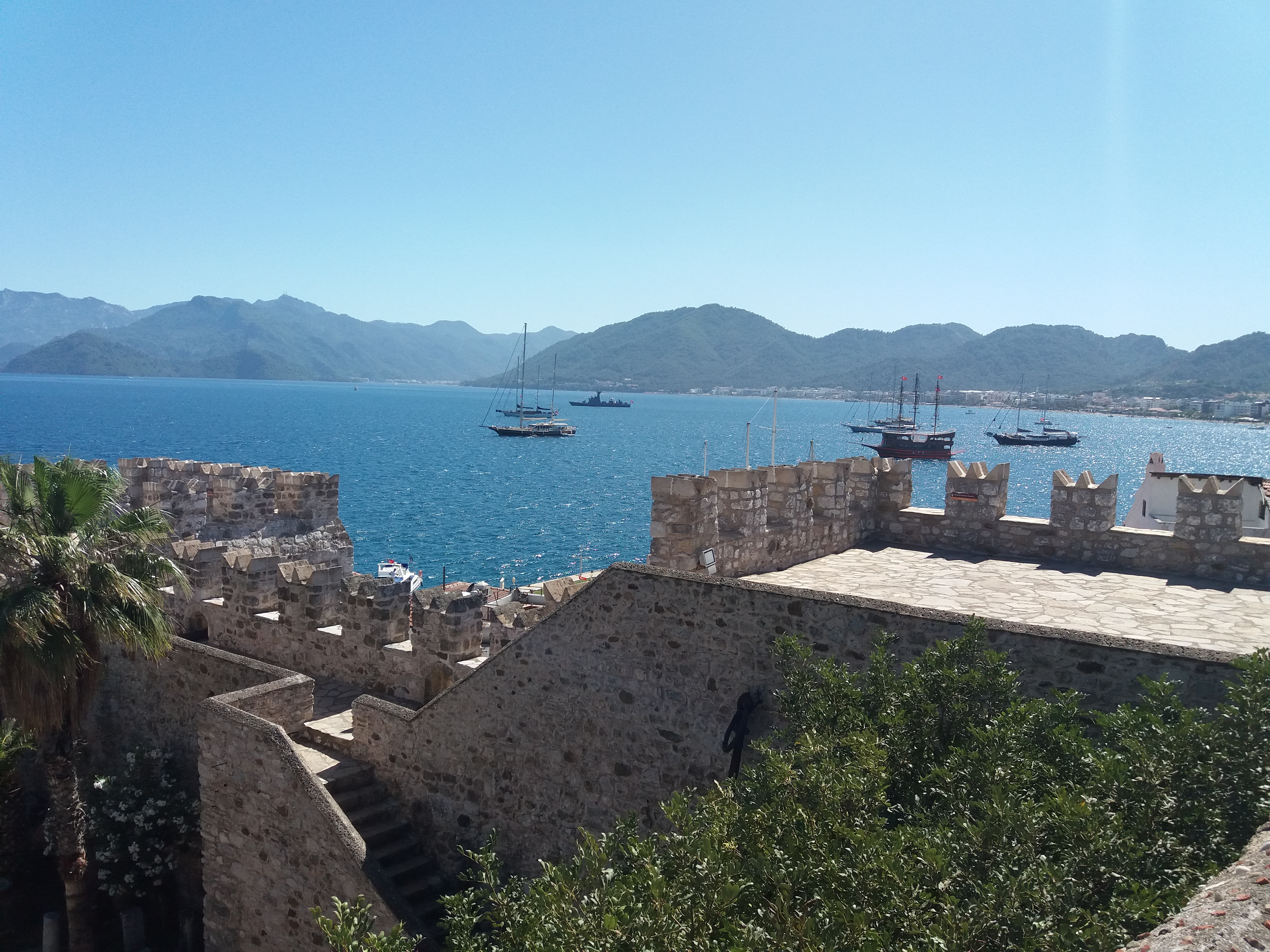
Marmaris Castle

=== Antiquity ===
It is not certain when Marmaris was founded but in the 6th century BC the site was known as Physkos (Ancient Greek: Φύσκος or Φοῦσκα, Phouska) in Greek, also Latinised as Physcus. It was in a part of Caria that belonged to Rhodes and contained a magnificent harbour and a grove sacred to Leto.

According to the historian Herodotus, there had been a castle on the site since 3000 BC. The area eventually came under the control of the Persian Empire. In 334 BC, Caria was invaded by Alexander the Great and Physkos Castle was besieged. The town's 600 inhabitants realised that they had no chance against the invading army and burned their valuables in the castle before escaping to the hills. Aware of the strategic value of the castle, the invaders repaired the destroyed sections to house a few hundred soldiers before the main army returned home.

=== Ottoman period ===
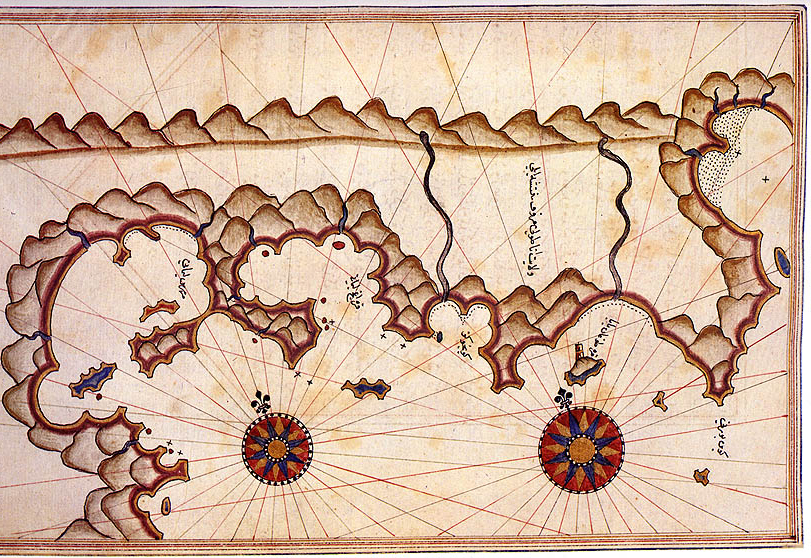
Map of Marmaris by Piri Reis

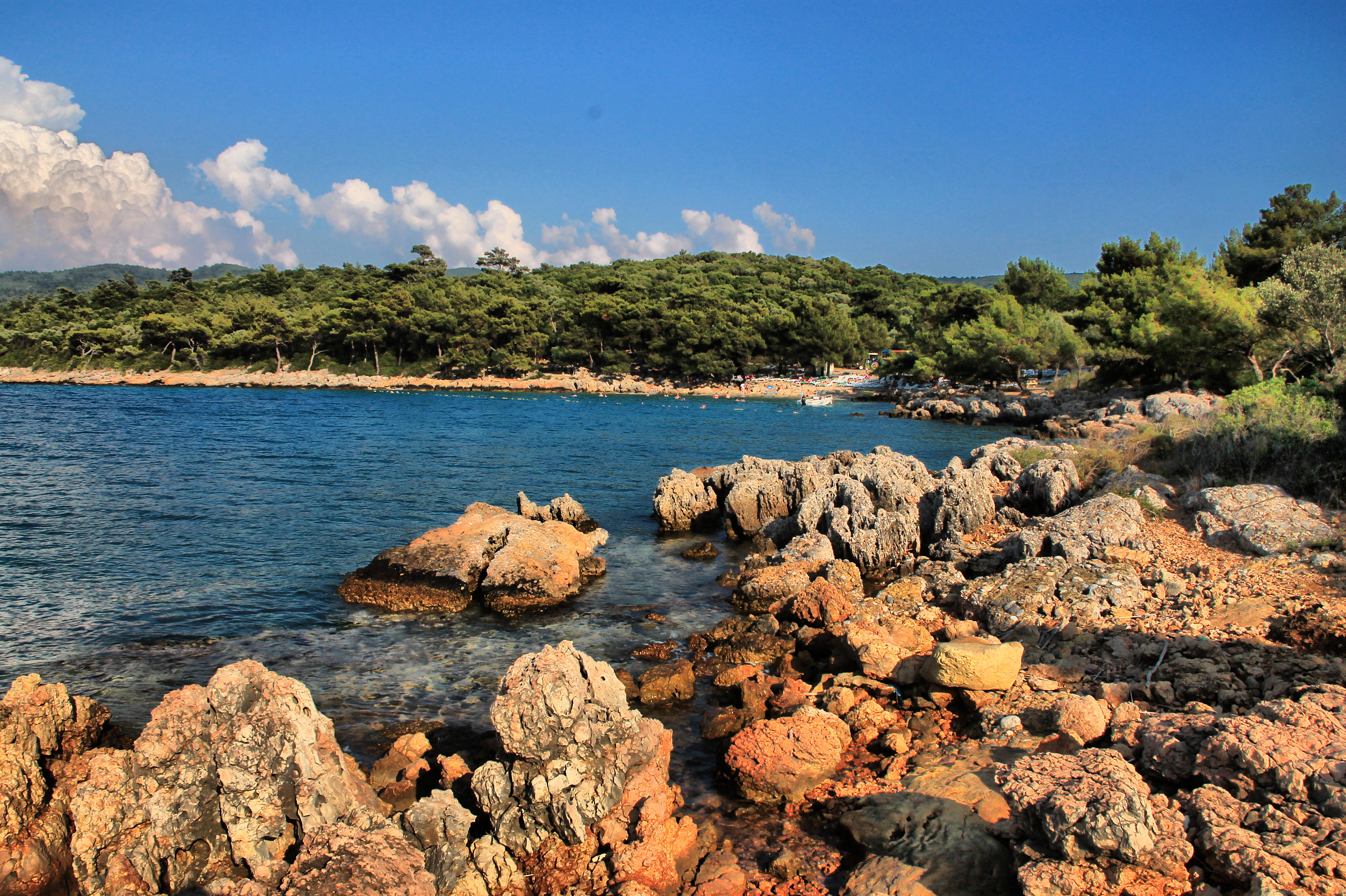
Karaca in Marmaris

In the later Middle Ages, Marmaris formed part of the Beylik of Menteşe. Then In the mid-fifteenth century, Sultan Mehmed the Conqueror conquered and united the various tribes and kingdoms of Anatolia and the Balkans, and acquired Constantinople. The Knights of St. John, based in Rhodes, had fought the Ottoman Empire for many years and managed to withstand the onslaughts of Mehmed II too. When Suleiman the Magnificent set out to conquer Rhodes, Marmaris served as a base for the Ottoman navy; Marmaris Castle was rebuilt from scratch in 1522 to accommodate an Ottoman army garrison.

In 1798, Admiral Nelson assembled his fleet in the harbour at Marmaris before setting sail for Egypt and the Battle of the Nile which put an end to Napoleon's ambitions in the Mediterranean.

In 1801, a British force of 120 ships under Admiral Keith and 14,000 troops under General Abercromby anchored in the bay for eight weeks, using the time to train and resupply ready their mission to end the French campaign in Egypt and Syria.

=== Modern times ===
Throughout Ottoman rule, Marmaris retained its Greek population up until the end of World War I. In the aftermath of the 1919–1922 Greco-Turkish War and the subsequent population exchange, the Greek population of Marmaris left for Greece and the town was settled by Turkish migrants from the Balkans. The two Fethiye earthquakes of 1957 almost completely destroyed the city. Only the castle and the historic buildings surrounding it were left undamaged.

Renovation work on the castle started in 1979. Under the auspices of the Ministry of Culture, it was converted into a museum with seven galleries, the largest of them used as an exhibition hall. The courtyard is full of seasonal flowers. Built at the same time as the castle, there is also a small Ottoman caravanserai built by Süleyman's mother Ayşe Hafsa Sultan in the bazaar.

There were many forest fires in the early 2020s.

== Tourism ==
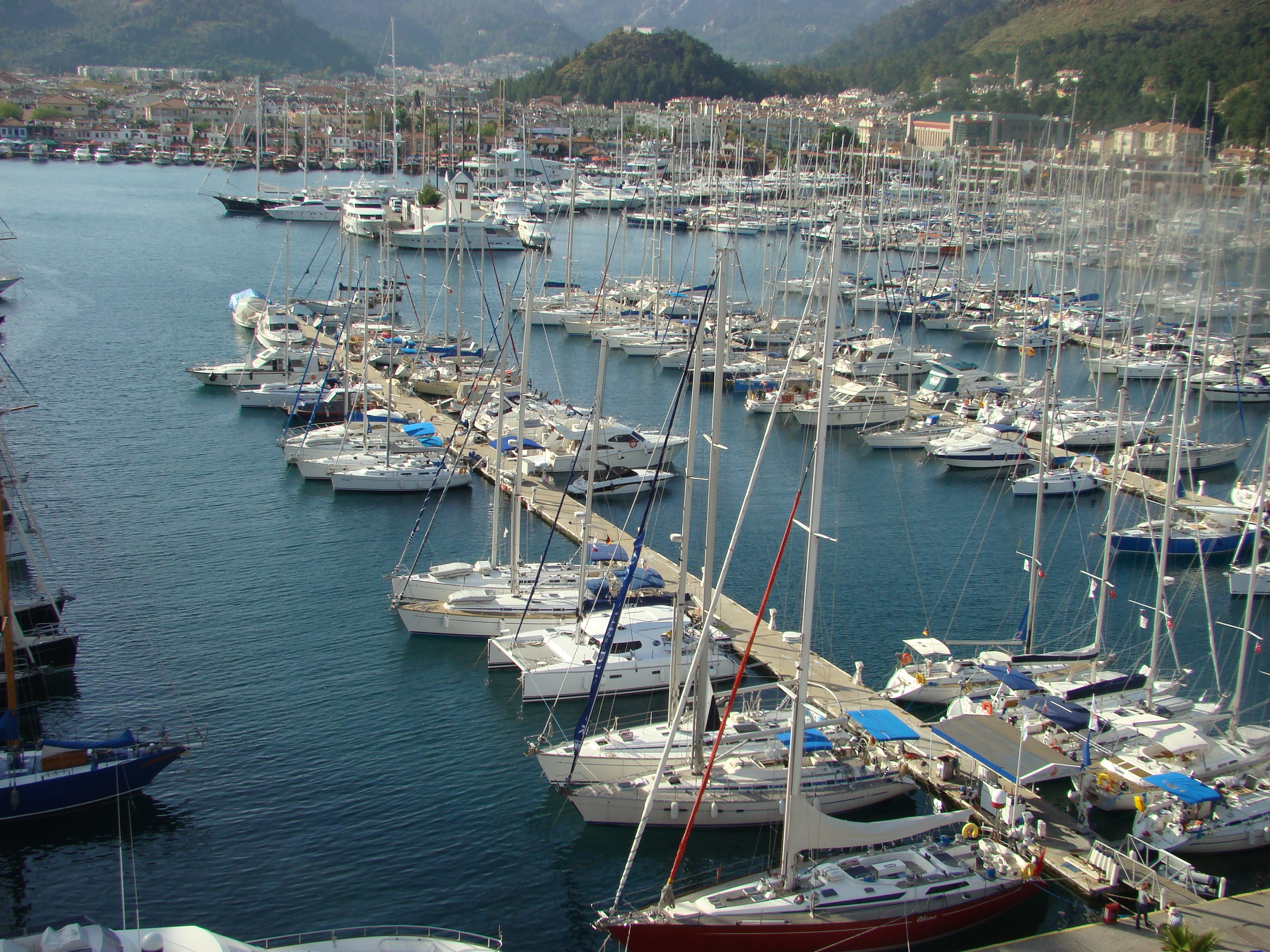
Marina of Marmaris

Marmaris is now a major package-holiday destination popular in particular with British visitors. Although adjacent İçmeler is theoretically a separate resort, these days the two more or less run into each other.

Most visitors to Marmaris come for the beaches and watersports. There are also popular cruises that take in islands in the surrounding bay, including Sedir Island (Turkish: Sedir Adası), commonly known as Cleopatra's Island, which is famous for its soft, white - and now protected - sand. Summer visitors can also take day trips to the Greek islands of Symi and Rhodes.

== Archaeology ==
In 2018, archaeologists discovered the 2300 year-old pyramid-shaped tomb of the ancient Greek boxer Diagoras near the city of Marmaris. The following words were inscribed on it in Greek: "I will be vigilant at the very top so as to ensure that no coward can come and destroy this grave," The structure had been believed to be the grave of a saint and was visited by locals seeking answers to their prayers, but once it was realised that it was not a holy site, the mausoleum was looted.

== Natural history ==
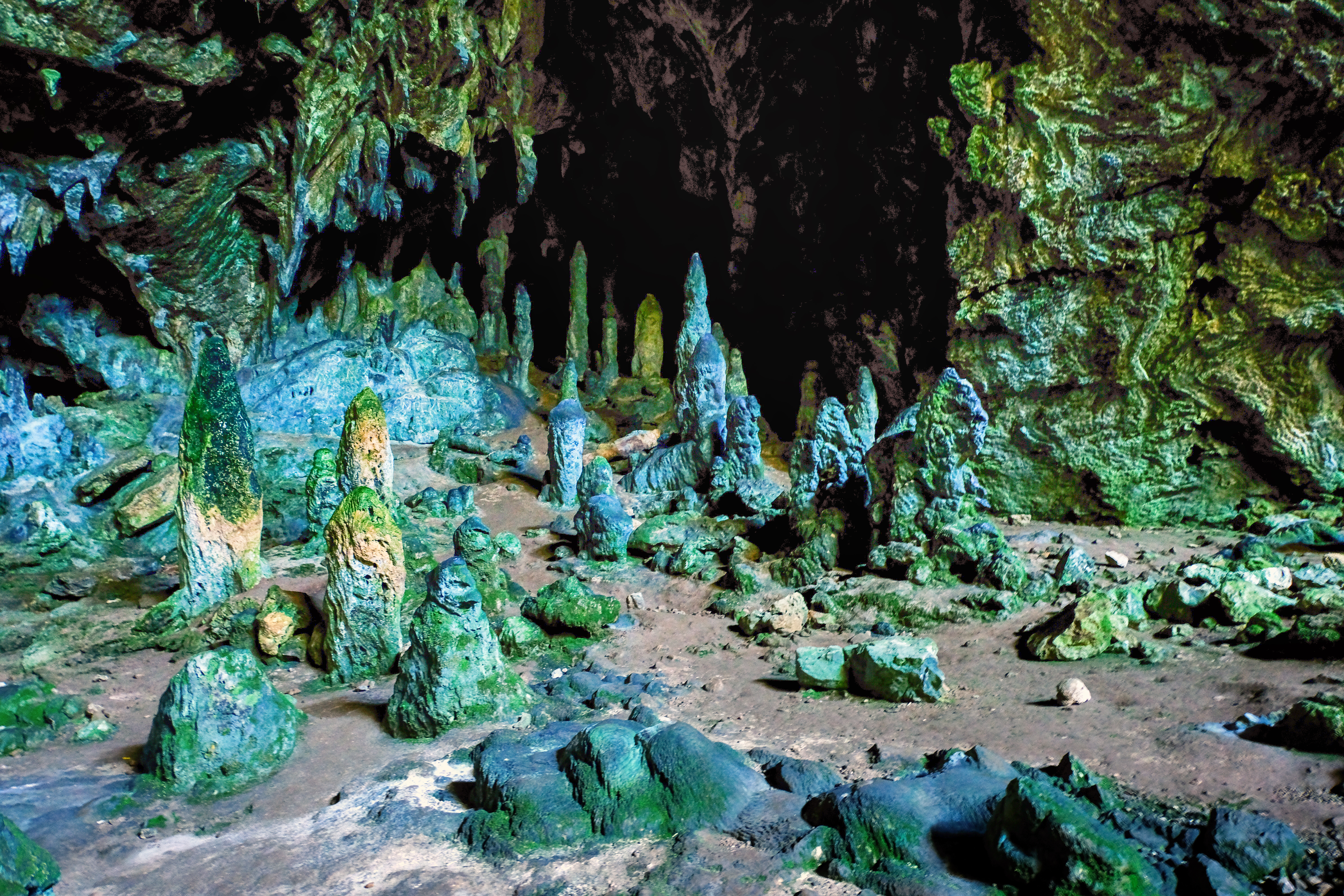
Nimara Cave on Heaven Island

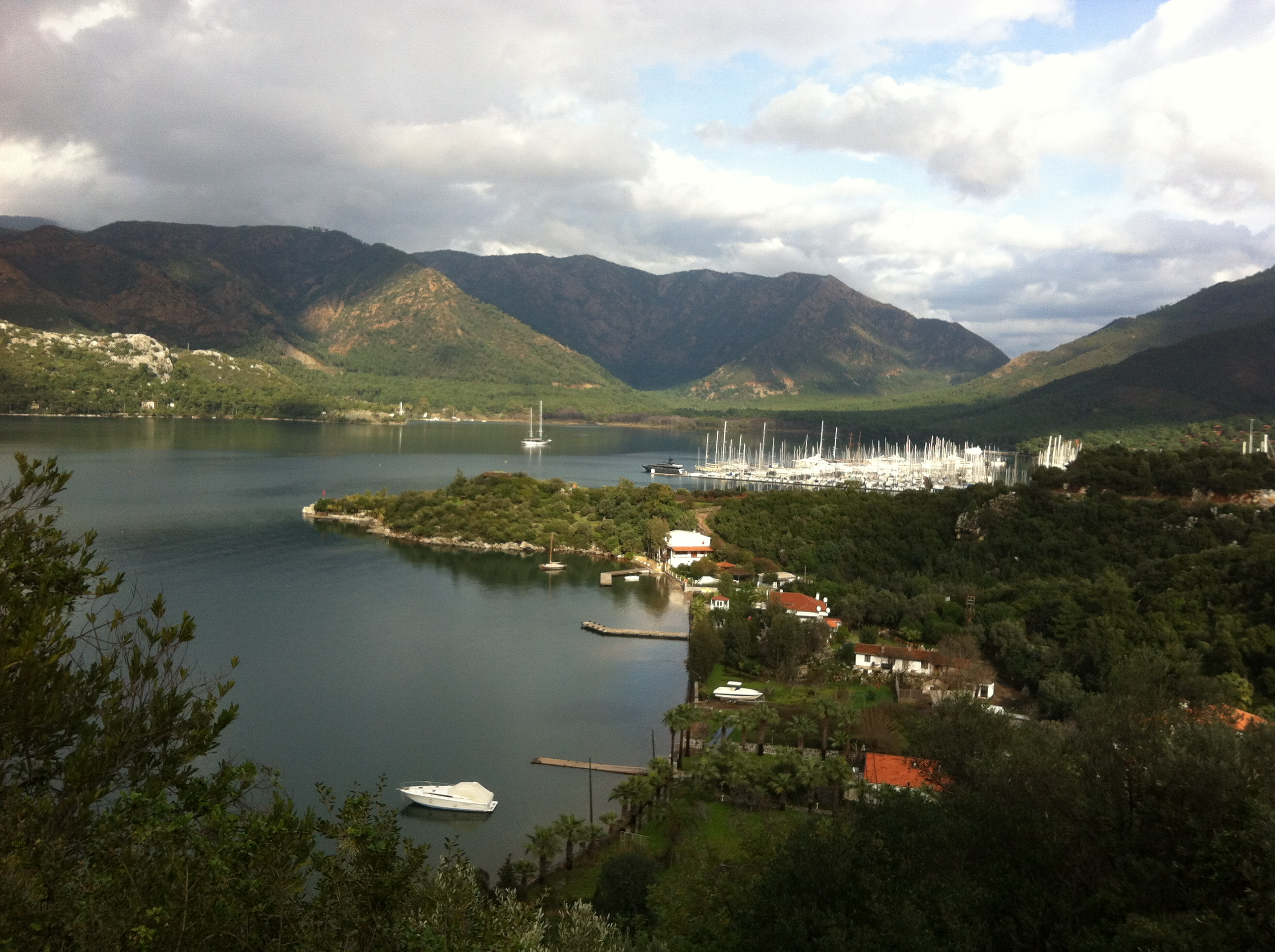
Heaven Island in Marmaris

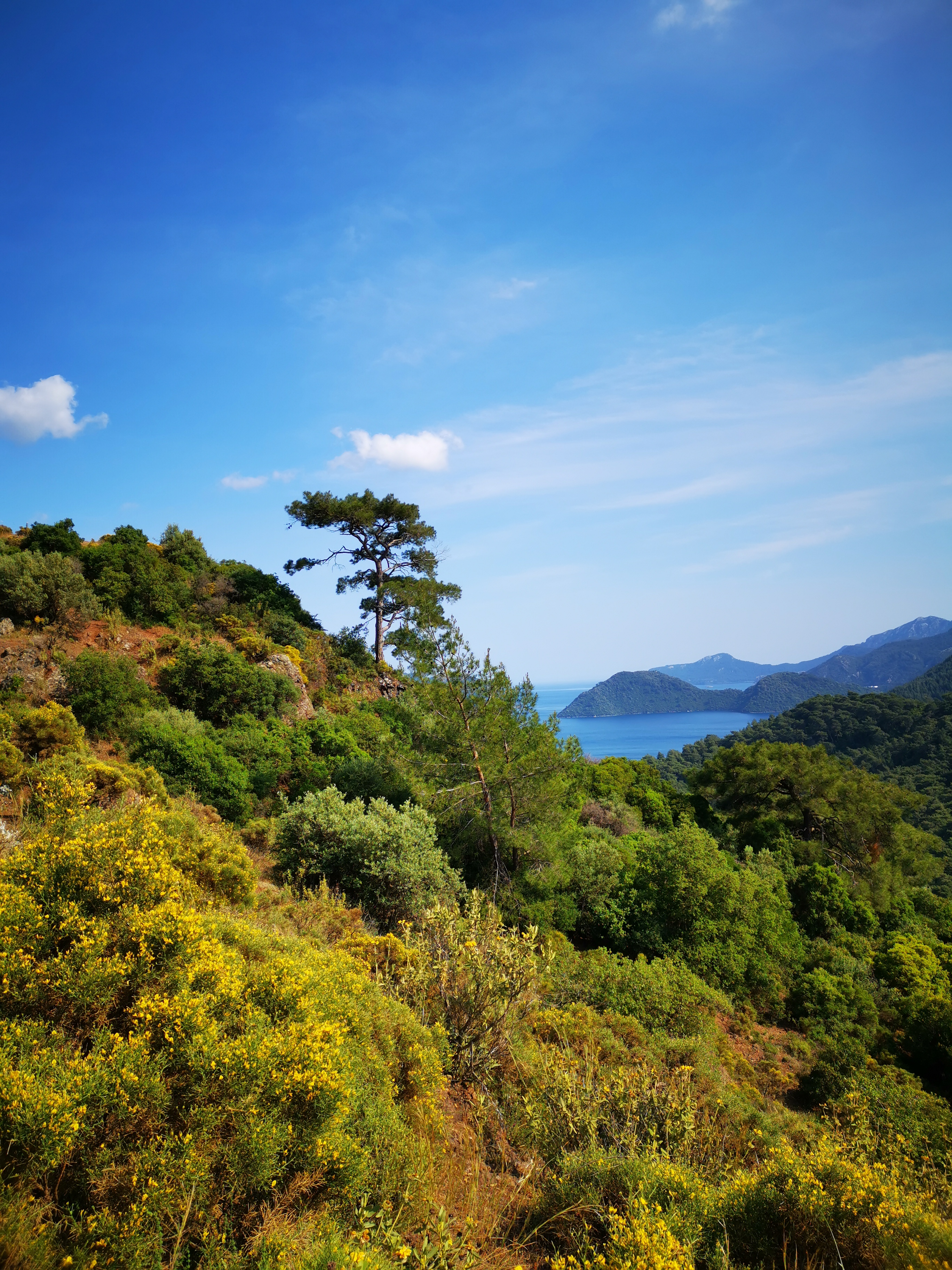
Marmaris National Park is a popular tourism destination.

Nimara Cave is located at the highest point of Heaven Island near Marmaris. Since ancient times, it was used as a place of worship. According to the ancient Greek historian Herodotus, human presence in the cave dated back to 3000 BC but excavations carried out by the Municipality of Marmaris in 2007 pushed this back by almost 12,000 years. Research conducted in the cave revealed the existence of a cult of the Mother Goddess Leto, the mother of God Apollo and Goddess Artemis, in the ancient city of Physkos. Worship took place around the main rock which is surrounded by stone altars in a semi-circle raised about 30 cm from the ground. Offerings in the form of cremations, glass beads, terracotta, and sculptures of Leto were placed on these elevated stones. The cave was also used during the Roman period.

Nimara Cave was declared a protected area in 1999. It shelters trogloxene butterflies, identical to those living in Fethiye's Butterfly Valley (Turkish: Kelebekler Vadisi).

The Marmaris peninsula is the westernmost habitat for Tulipa armena, which normally grows in Eastern Turkey, Iran, and Transcaucasia at much higher altitudes. The plants may have been introduced during the Ottoman period.

== Composition ==
There are 25 neighbourhoods in Marmaris District:

- Adaköy
- Armutalan
- Bayırköy
- Beldibi
- Bozburun
- Çamdibi
- Çamlı
- Çetibeli
- Çıldır
- Hatipirimi
- Hisarönü
- İçmeler
- Karaca
- Kemeraltı
- Orhaniye
- Osmaniye
- Sarıana
- Selimiye
- Siteler
- Söğütköy
- Taşlıca
- Tepe
- Turgutköy
- Turunç
- Yeşilbelde

== Climate ==
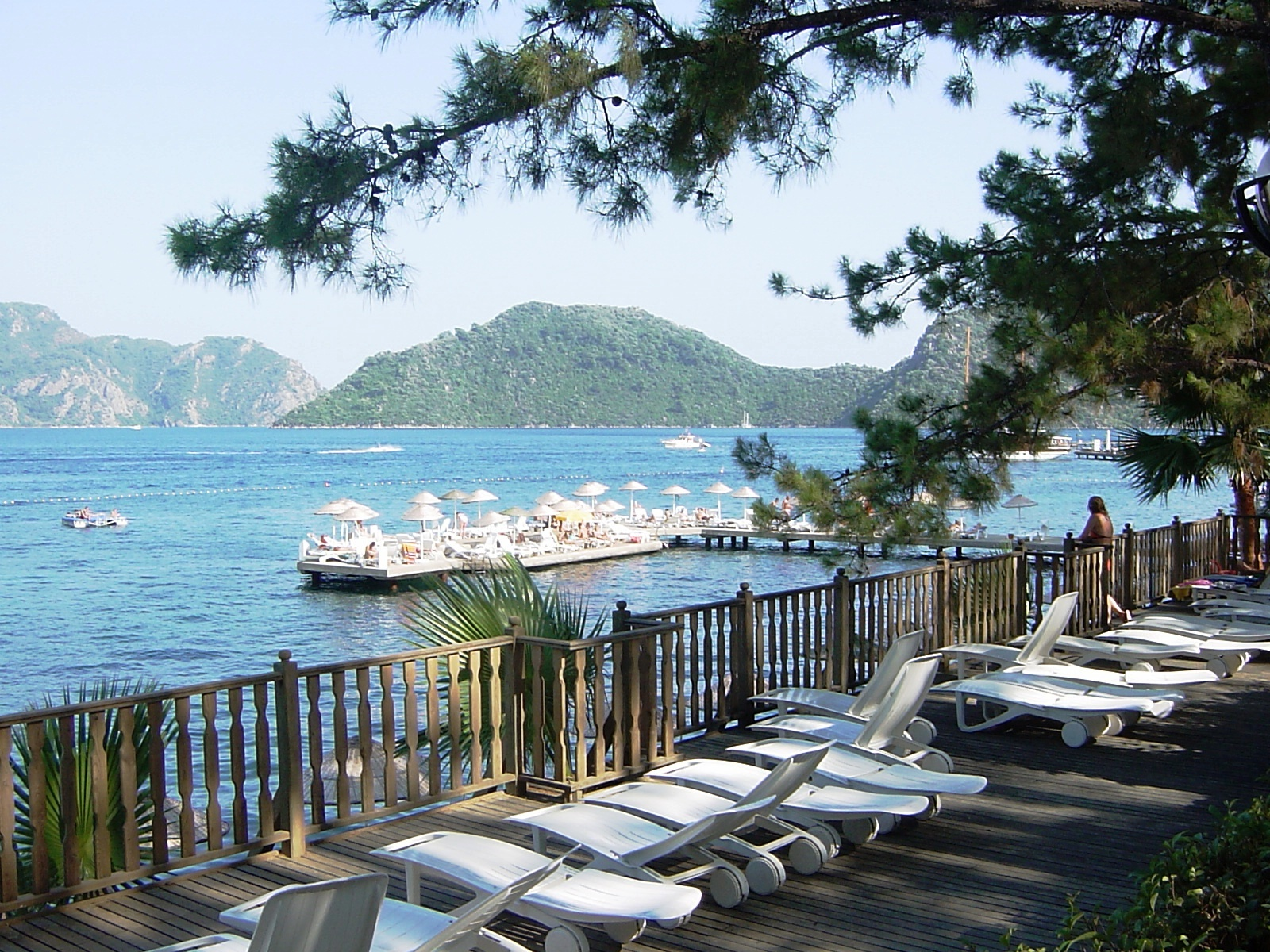
Beaches of Marmaris

Marmaris has a hot-summer Mediterranean climate (Köppen: Csa) characterised by hot dry summers and mild rainy winters. Showers and rain are very unlikely between May and October. Summers are hot and dry, and temperatures are especially high during the heatwaves in July and August. Temperatures start to cool in September and October is still warm and bright, though with spells of rain. Winter is the rainy season, with most precipitation falling after November. Annual average rainfall is 1,257 millimetres (49.488 in) and heavy cloudbursts can cause flash floods in flood prone areas. Winter temperatures are usually mild.

Climate data for Marmaris (1991–2020)
| Month | Jan | Feb | Mar | Apr | May | Jun | Jul | Aug | Sep | Oct | Nov | Dec | Year |
|---|---|---|---|---|---|---|---|---|---|---|---|---|---|
| Record high °C (°F) | 21.0 (69.8) | 24.0 (75.2) | 28.4 (83.1) | 31.0 (87.8) | 36.0 (96.8) | 42.2 (108.0) | 43.1 (109.6) | 45.5 (113.9) | 40.7 (105.3) | 39.0 (102.2) | 31.6 (88.9) | 22.2 (72.0) | 45.5 (113.9) |
| Mean daily maximum °C (°F) | 15.4 (59.7) | 15.9 (60.6) | 18.2 (64.8) | 21.5 (70.7) | 26.4 (79.5) | 31.8 (89.2) | 34.9 (94.8) | 35.0 (95.0) | 31.4 (88.5) | 26.5 (79.7) | 21.1 (70.0) | 16.8 (62.2) | 24.6 (76.3) |
| Daily mean °C (°F) | 10.7 (51.3) | 11.3 (52.3) | 13.4 (56.1) | 16.4 (61.5) | 21.0 (69.8) | 26.0 (78.8) | 28.9 (84.0) | 29.1 (84.4) | 25.7 (78.3) | 21.1 (70.0) | 16.0 (60.8) | 12.3 (54.1) | 19.4 (66.9) |
| Mean daily minimum °C (°F) | 6.9 (44.4) | 7.3 (45.1) | 8.9 (48.0) | 11.8 (53.2) | 16.2 (61.2) | 21.0 (69.8) | 23.9 (75.0) | 24.3 (75.7) | 21.1 (70.0) | 16.7 (62.1) | 11.9 (53.4) | 8.6 (47.5) | 14.9 (58.8) |
| Record low °C (°F) | −2.4 (27.7) | −3.4 (25.9) | −1.2 (29.8) | 1.4 (34.5) | 8.0 (46.4) | 12.5 (54.5) | 16.8 (62.2) | 16.7 (62.1) | 12.8 (55.0) | 5.5 (41.9) | 1.4 (34.5) | −1.0 (30.2) | −3.4 (25.9) |
| Average precipitation mm (inches) | 255.98 (10.08) | 178.92 (7.04) | 125.74 (4.95) | 73.3 (2.89) | 29.04 (1.14) | 6.38 (0.25) | 5.6 (0.22) | 0.76 (0.03) | 22.1 (0.87) | 87.92 (3.46) | 182.3 (7.18) | 289.01 (11.38) | 1,257.05 (49.49) |
| Average precipitation days (≥ 1.0 mm) | 11.4 | 10.3 | 7.3 | 5.8 | 3.6 | 2.0 | 1.8 | 1.0 | 2.0 | 4.6 | 7.0 | 11.2 | 68.0 |
| Mean monthly sunshine hours | 127.1 | 137.2 | 192.2 | 222 | 285.2 | 324 | 344.1 | 328.6 | 273 | 217 | 144 | 111.6 | 2,706 |
Source: NOAA

== Sports ==
The Final Four matches of the 2013 Men's European Volleyball League were held in the Amiral Orhan Aydın Sports Hall in Marmaris from July 13 to 14.

The Presidential Cycling Tour of Turkey (Turkish: Cumhurbaşkanlığı Bisiklet Turu) is a professional road bicycle racing stage race held each spring.

Every year in late October Marmaris hosts a regatta attracting domestic and international boats and crews.

== Twin towns/sister cities ==
Marmaris is twinned with:

- Fürth, Germany
- Jinan, China
- Ordu, Turkey
- Dzerzhinsky, Russia

== See also ==
- Gulf of Gökova
- Turkish Riviera
