= İçmeler =

- Neighbourhood
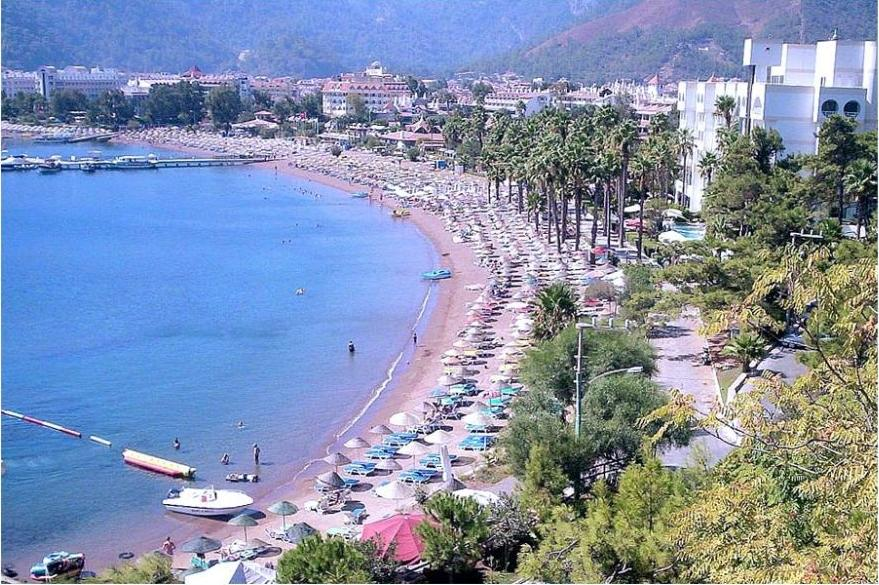
- Hotels along İçmeler beach

- Location within Turkey Location within Turkey Aegean
- Coordinates: 36.8083°N 28.2167°E
- Country: Turkey
- Province: Muğla
- District: Marmaris
- Population (2022): 6,735
- Time zone: UTC+3 (TRT)
- Postal code: 48700
- Area code: 0252

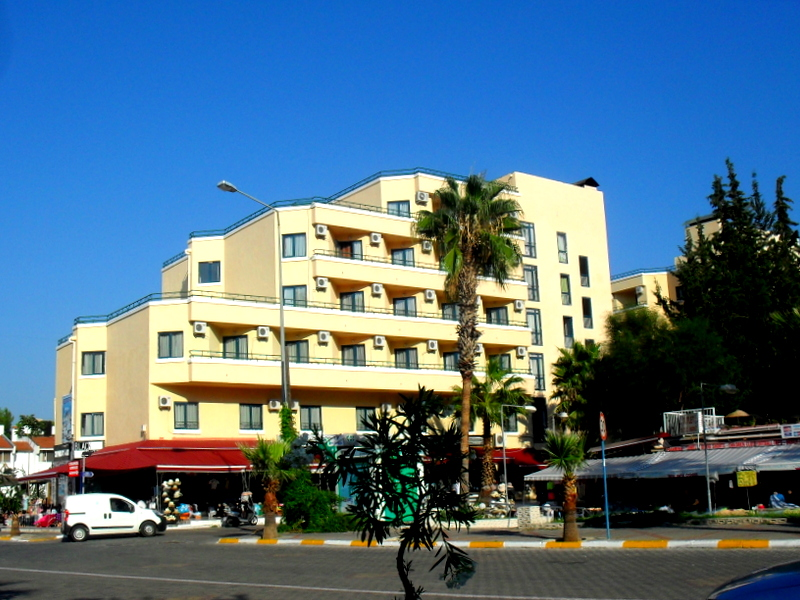
İçmeler

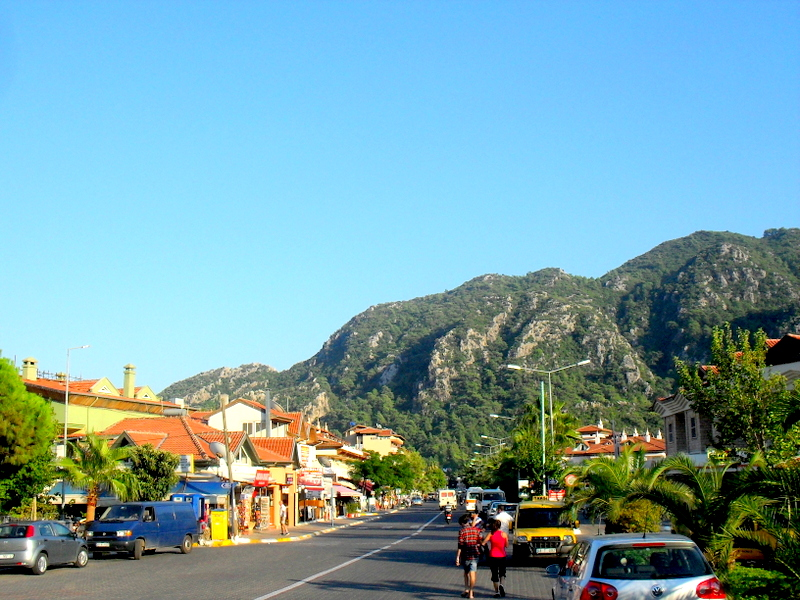
İçmeler

İçmeler is a neighbourhood of the municipality and district of Marmaris, Muğla Province, Turkey. Its population is 6,735 (2022). Before the 2013 reorganisation, it was a town (belde). It is a popular holiday resort situated 8 kilometres (5 mi) southwest of Marmaris. İçmeler Bay is located on the Datça Peninsula. The town is surrounded on three sides by pine forests. Hiking on the mountains is very popular and provides fantastic views of the region.

Pronounced in English approximately as /eech-mell-er/, the town has developed rapidly over the last 15 years, with accommodation and other tourist facilities mushrooming across the formerly sleepy fishermen's and sponge divers' village. As a side to the increasing tourism, this resort in the Turkish Riviera is seeing an increasing amount of water sports facilities, such as scuba diving, windsurfing, and waterskiing.

The town developed on the backs of tourists seeking a quieter alternative to the overdeveloped city of Marmaris.

Nightlife is rather scarce in İçmeler. Restaurants and pubs usually feature live music, shows and acts until around midnight. After this time, the only entertainment available is generally the nightclubs.

Directly across the bay from İçmeler is the busy port of Marmaris, which also gives its name to the region. Marmara (historically Merme) is the name for marble, which Turkey has in abundance.

Whilst loved by tourists for the shopping and relaxed nature, prices in İçmeler have increased in recent years. However, the town continues to compare favourably with the neighbouring resort of Marmaris and is especially favourable when compared to the Eurozone.

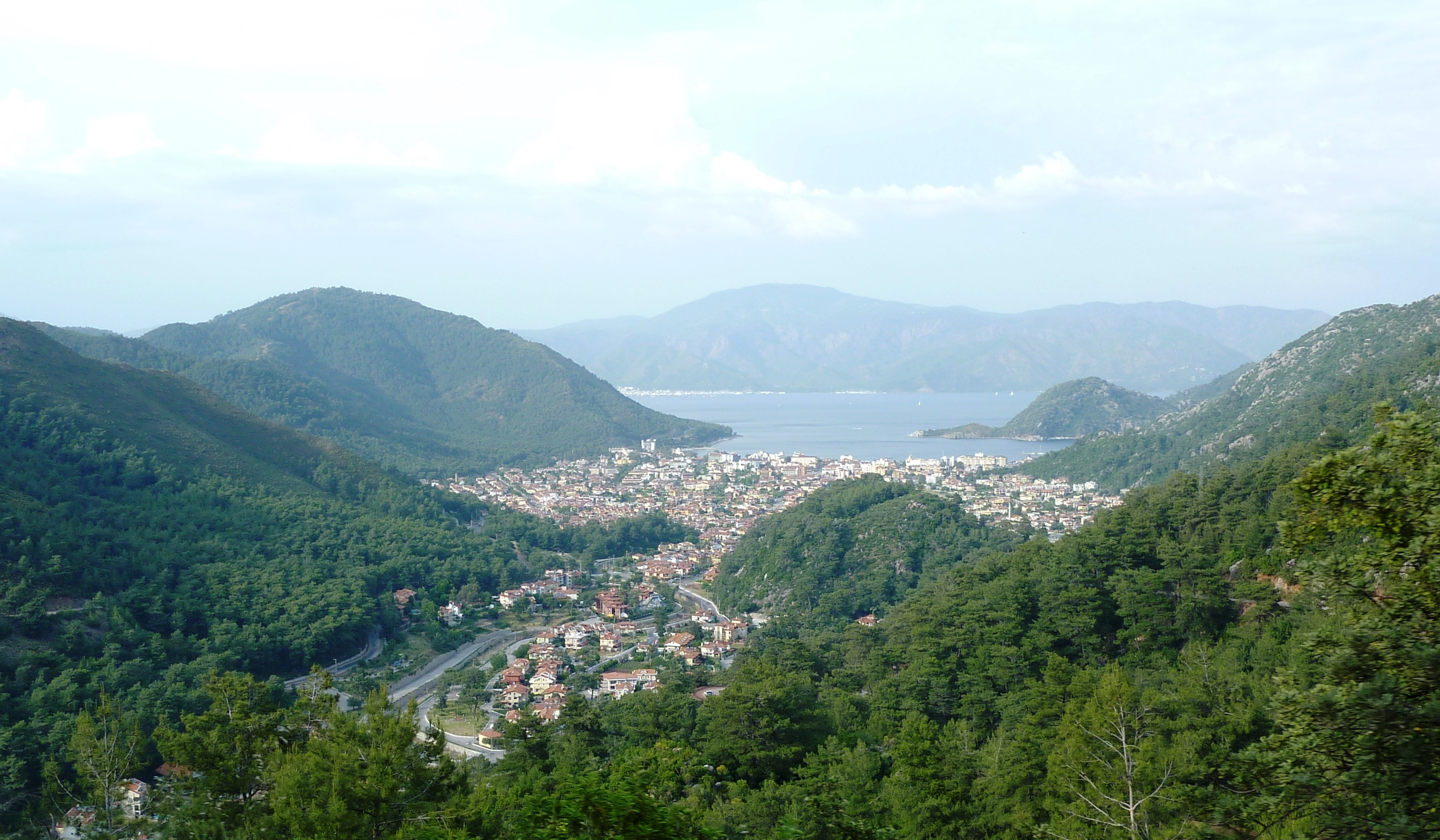
Panorama of İçmeler

== See also ==
- Turkish Riviera
- Marinas in Turkey
- Foreign purchases of real estate in Turkey
