= Carian Trail =

Hiking trail in Turkey

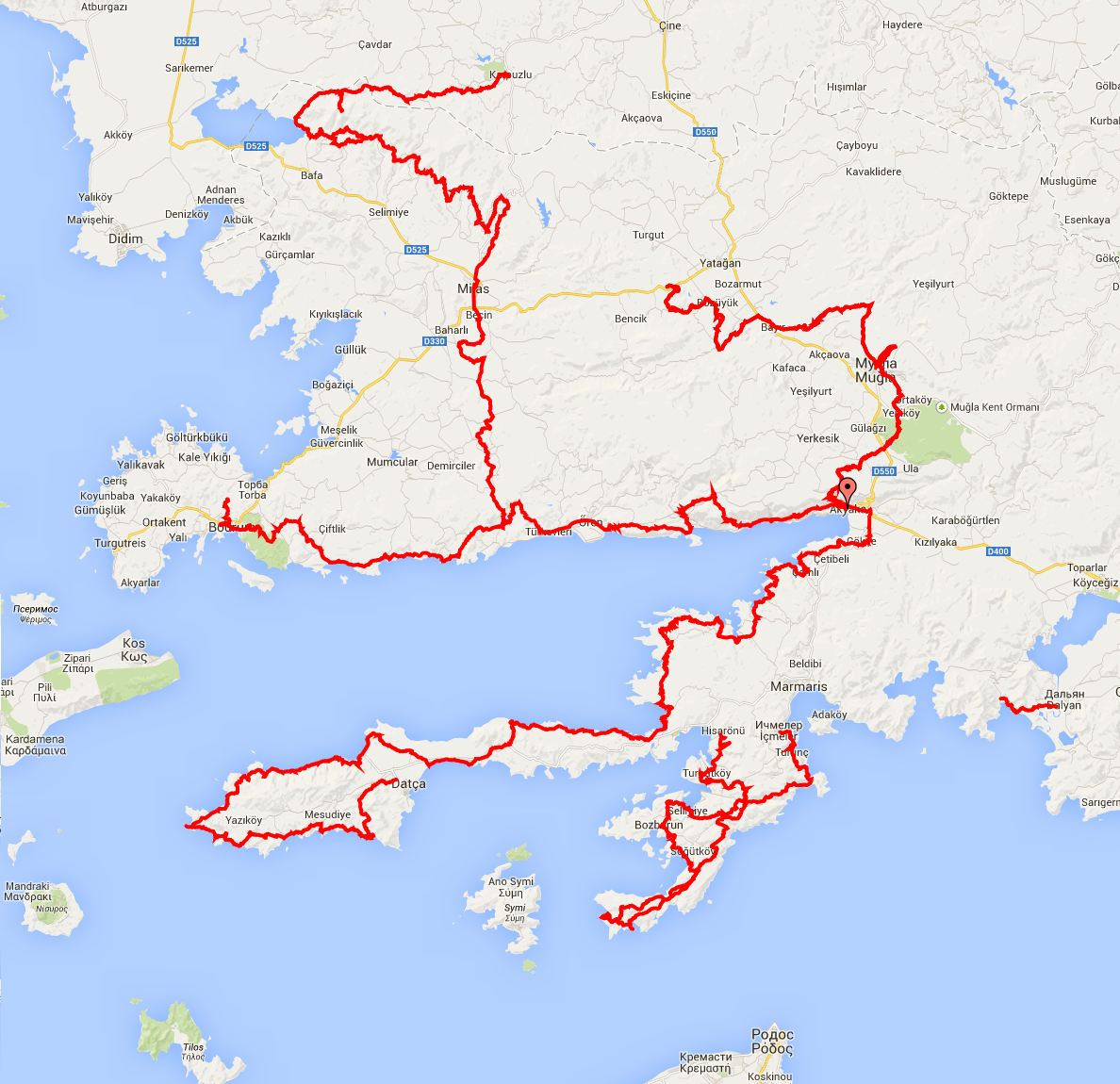
- Map of the Carian Trail
- Length: c. 820 km (510 mi)
- Location: Aydın and Muğla, Turkey
- Established: 2013
- Trailheads: İçmeler, Marmaris
- Use: Hiking and cycling
- Months: Spring, autumn and winter months
- Waymark: Red and white stripes
- Hazards: Severe weather, dehydration, wildlife

The Carian Trail (Turkish: Karia Yolu) is an 820 km long-distance footpath exploring the South Western corner of Turkey through the modern provinces of Muğla and Aydın. The trail is officially opened in 2013 and winds through some of the lesser known regions of Turkey.

The trail is named after the Carian civilization, indigenous people of Asia Minor. It passes through an area with many ancient ruins. Stone paved caravan roads and mule paths connect villages from the coast to a mountainous hinterland. There are pine forest covered mountain slopes, olive terraces and almond groves which are an important part of the region's economy.

The trail is signed and waymarked with red and white stripes (Grande Randonnee convention) allowing both independent and group travelers from inside and outside of Turkey to hike the trail.

== History ==
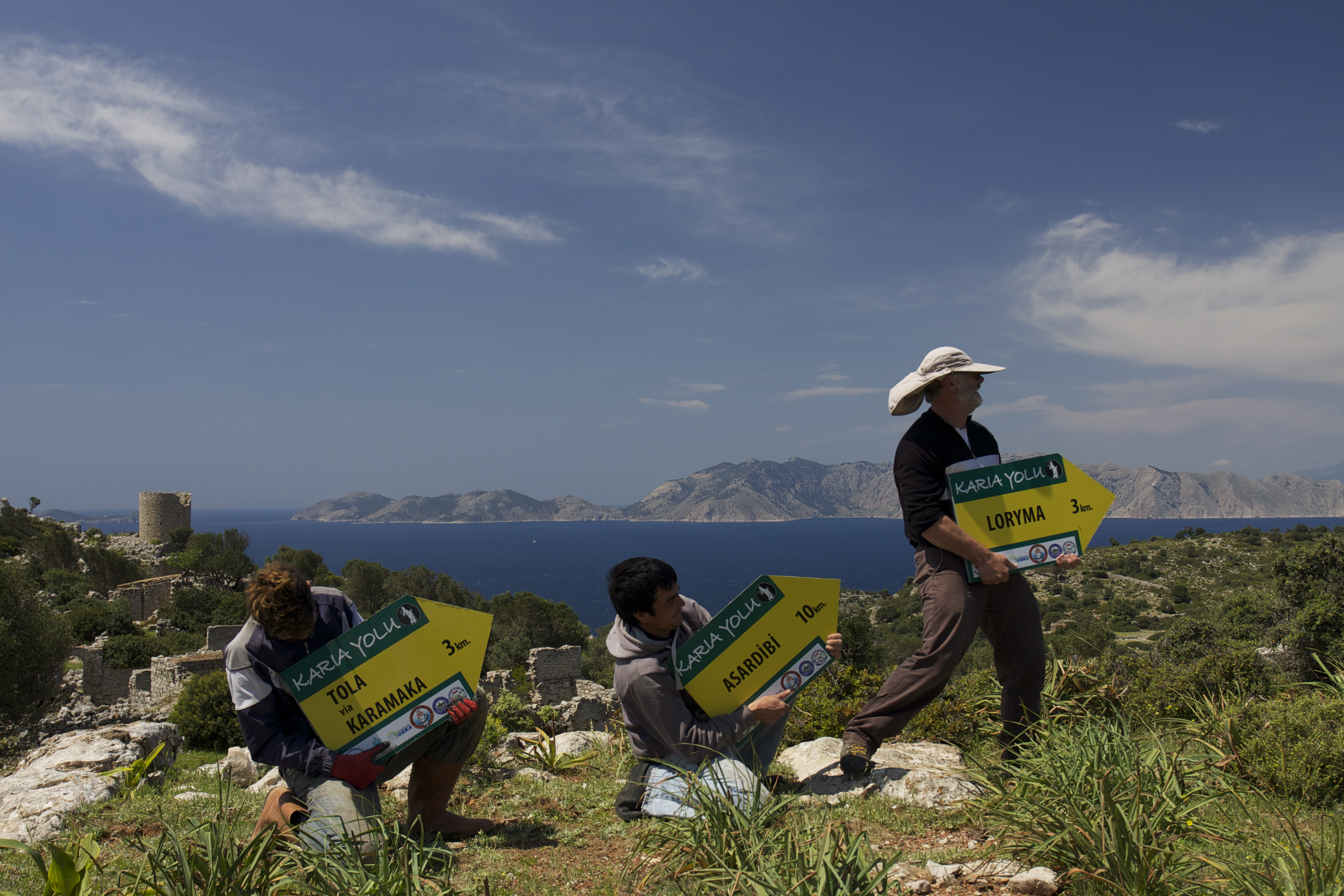
Putting signposts on Carian Trail

Even though it's known that local hikers have used the trail for outdoor sports before the establishment of the Carian trail, foundation of a continuous trail can be attributed to the premise expedition trips of Yunus Özdemir, Altay Özcan, Volkan Demir and Dean Livesley starting in 2009, which lasted 4 winters. The idea behind the expedition was to establish a long-distance hiking trail around the historical Carian regions. After the initial expeditions a route made of historic roads, village paths, ridgeways and forest alleys was established.

Under the leadership of Muğla Chamber of Commerce and Industry (Muğla Ticaret ve Sanayi Odası) the Carian Trail project has been launched. In 2012 South Aegean Development Agency (Güney Ege Kalkınma Ajansı) also started to support it with additional monetary backing. The Carian Trail has officially opened in February 2013.

== Route ==
820 km long trail has 4 main sections, Bozburun, Datça Peninsula, Gulf of Gökova and Carian Hinterland, with an additional section that encompass Muğla and surrounding regions. All of the trail has been divided into 46 stages. It also includes a smaller 11 km long section called Dalyan, which is isolated from other sections. Some sections and stages can be cycled.

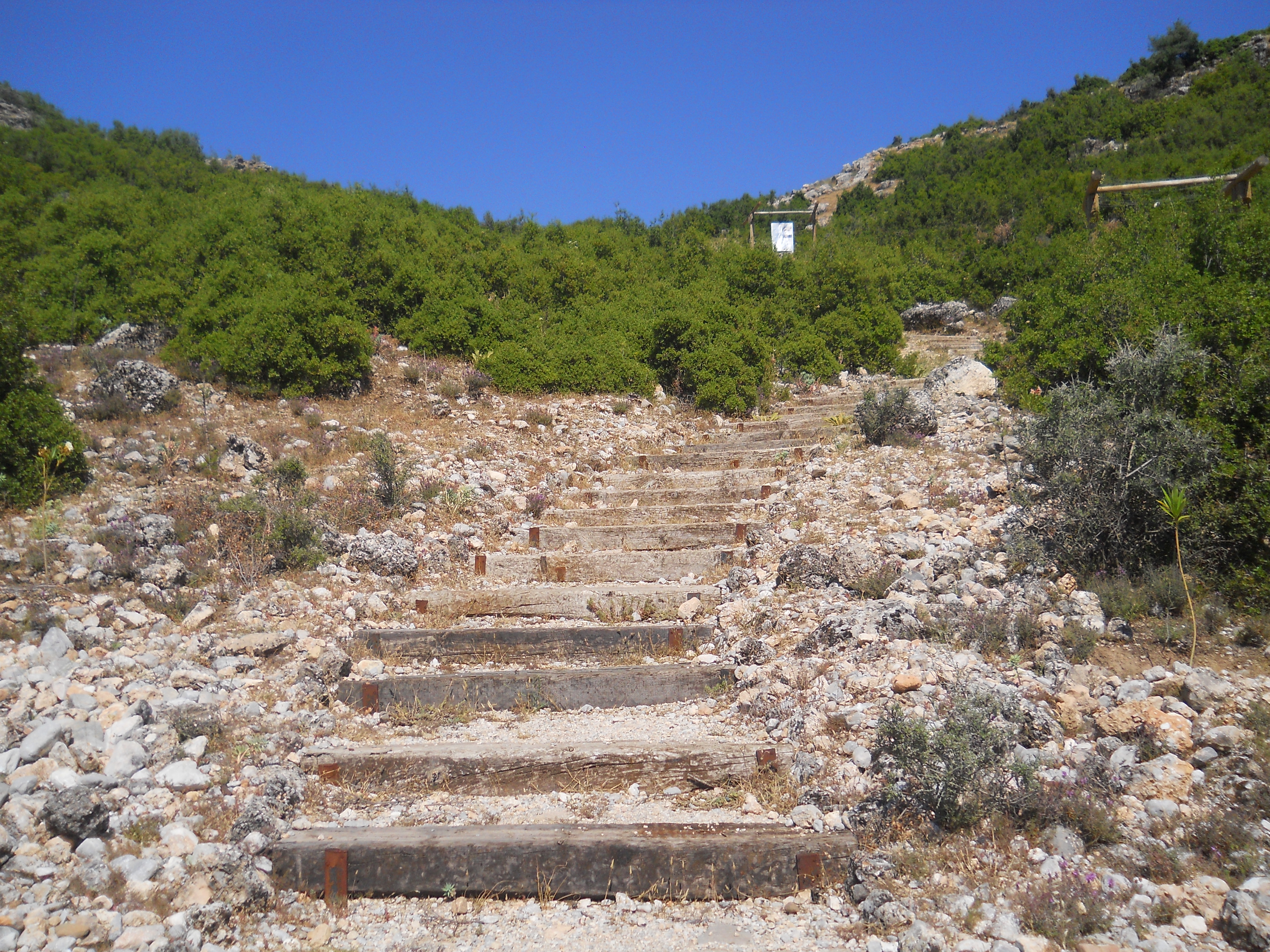
A view of the Carian Trail at Menteşe, Muğla

=== Bozburun Peninsula ===
Bozburun Peninsula section is 141.2 km long and is the official starting point of the trail. It starts from İçmeler and follows Turunç, Kumlubük, Bayır, Taşlıca, Söğüt, Bozburun, Selimiye, Orhaniye, and ends in Hisarönü.

=== Datça Peninsula ===
Datça Peninsula is 240.7 km of length. The section starts from Old town of Datça, 3 km before Datça, and follows Hızırşah, Domuzçukuru, Mesudiye, Palamutbükü, Knidos, Karaköy, Kızlan, Emecik, Balıkaşıran, Akçapınar, and ends in Akyaka. The part from Balıkaşıran to Akyaka can also be biked.

=== Gulf of Gökova ===
Ceramic Gulf (Gulf of Gökova) is a section with 139.2 km of trail. The section starts from Akyaka and heads west following Turnalı, Sarnıç, Akbük, Alatepe, Ören (Ceramos), Türkevleri, Bozalan, Mazı, Çiftlik, Kızılağaç and arrives in Bodrum (Halicarnassos) finishing in ancient city of Pedasa. Due to widespread fires in summer 2021, parts of the trail are still blocked and the trail is barely frequented. From Bozalan to Çakılıyalı, an alternative route can be taken passing the village Çökertme. From Yaliçiftlik to Bodrum, the Leleg Yolu (red/yellow marking) is a possible alternative route which is in good condition.

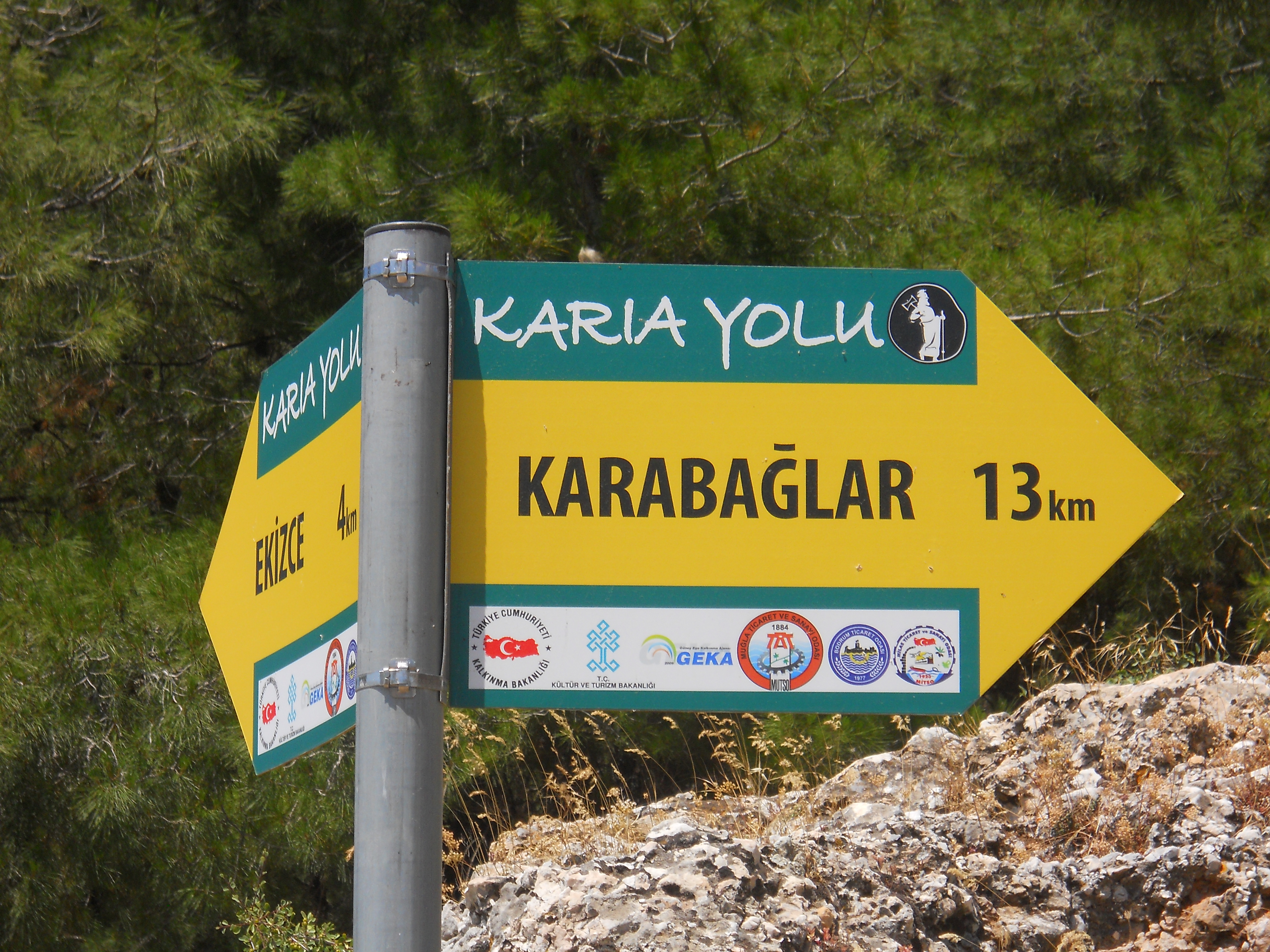
A typical sign on the trail

=== Carian Hinterland ===
Carian Hinterland section is 174.2 km long and starts from Bozalan heading North and follows Fesleğen, Karacahisar, Milas (Mylasa), Kargıcak, Labraunda, Sarıkaya, Çomakdağ, Kayabükü, Sakarkaya and arrives at the shores of Lake Bafa. Heading up the Latmos (Menteşe mountains) the trail continues to the summit (1350 m), Bağarcık, Kullar, Yahşiler, Tekeler and finishes in Karpuzlu (Alinda) which is the official finish of the Carian Trail.

=== Muğla Environs ===
Muğla Environs section consists of 108.5 km of trail. Heading north to Akyaka, the section passes through Kuyucak, Karabağlar, Muğla, Değirmendere Kanyonu, Ekizce, Bayır, Belen Kahvesi and finishes in the ancient city of Stratonikeia. It is possible to bike most of this section.

=== Dalyan ===
Dalyan is the smallest section of the trail with only 11 km of length. The route starts from Dalyan and passes by Kaunos, a historically important sea port with a history that can be tracked back to the 10th century BC. Trail ends in Ekincik Bay.

== Ancient sites ==
The route passes through a number of ancient cities; These include:

- Amos
- Syrna
- Phoenix
- Loryma
- Hydas
- Castabus
- Knidos
- Idyma
- Thera
- Mobolla
- Stratonikeia
- Ceramos
- Halicarnassos
- Pedasa
- Mylasa
- Labraunda
- Herakleia ad Latmos
- Alinda
- Caunos

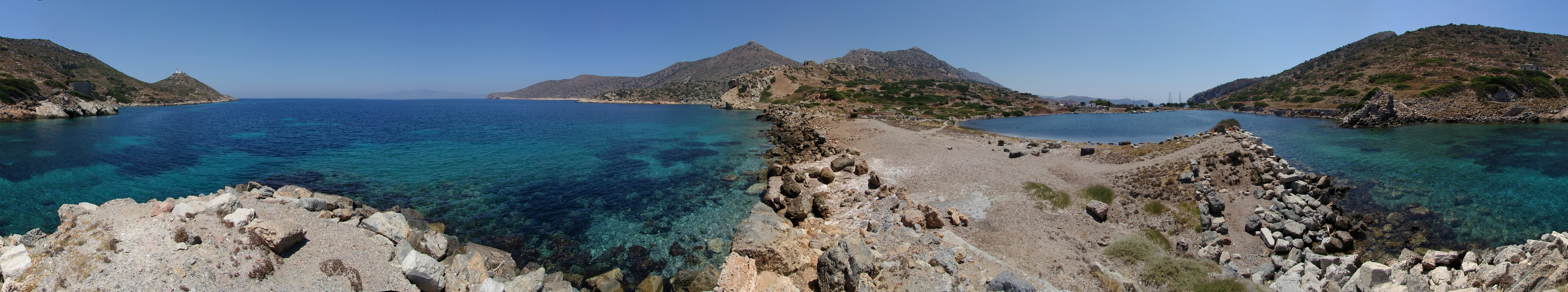
Panoramic view of Knidos
