= Gökova (disambiguation) =

Gökova may refer to:

- Gulf of Gökova - A gulf in the Aegean Sea in south-west Turkey (alternate names; Gulf of Kerme, Ceramic Gulf)
- Gökova - A township at the end of Gulf of Gökova,
- Gökova Plain - An alluvial plain at the end of Gulf of Gökova where the town of Gökova and a number of other settlements, notably Akyaka, Muğla are located,
- Gökova - A casual term used locally to describe the area of touristic interest along Gökova Plain,
