= List of ancient settlements in Turkey =

Aspect of Turkish archaeology

Below is the list of ancient settlements in Turkey. There are innumerable ruins of ancient settlements spread all over the country. While some ruins date back to Neolithic times, most of them were settlements of Hittites, Phrygians, Lydians, Ionians, Urartians, and so on.

List of settlements

In the table below, only the settlements which have articles in this encyclopaedia are shown, with the exception of the following:

- A few ancient settlements are still in use (Adana, Amasya, Ankara, Istanbul, Tarsus etc.) These settlements are not included in the list unless separate articles for the ancient sites exist.
- Some ancient settlements which were well documented are known by name, but so far they have not been unearthed and their exact locations are obscure. (For example; Washukanni, the capital of Mittani.)

== A–An ==
| Name of the settlement | Province | Notes | Image |
|---|---|---|---|
| Aigai | Manisa | | |
| Aizanoi | Kütahya | | |
| Alabanda | Aydın | | |
| Alacahöyük | Çorum | | |
| Alalakh | Hatay | | |
| Alexandria Troas | Çanakkale | | |
| Alinda | Aydın | | |
| Alişar Hüyük | Yozgat | | |
| Allianoi | İzmir | | |
| Altıntepe | Erzincan | | |
| Amorium | Afyon | | |
| Amyzon | Aydın | | |
| Anazarbus | Adana | | |
| Anchiale | Mersin | | |
| Ancoz | Adıyaman | | |
| Ani | Kars | | |
| Antigoneia | Hatay | | |
| Antioch | Hatay | | |
| Antioch on the Maeander | Aydın | | |
| Antioch, Pisidia | Isparta | | |
| Antiochia ad Taurum | Gaziantep | | |
| Antiochia Lamotis | Mersin | | |
| Antiochia ad Pyramum | Adana | | |
| Antiochia, Şanlıurfa | Şanlıurfa | | |

== Ap–Az ==
| Name of the settlement | Province | Notes | Image |
|---|---|---|---|
| Apamea on Euphrates | Şanlıurfa | | |
| Apamea, Phrygia | Afyon | | |
| Apamea Myrlea | Bursa | | |
| Aphrodisias | Aydın | | |
| Aphrodisias of Cilicia | Mersin | | |
| Apollonia | İzmir | | |
| Apollonia ad Rhyndacum | Bursa | | |
| Apros | Tekirdağ | | |
| Ariassos | Antalya | | |
| Arsinoe | Mersin | | |
| Arycanda | Antalya | | |
| Aspendos | Antalya | | |
| Assos | Çanakkale | | |
| Atarneus | İzmir | | |
| Attuda | Denizli | | |
| Aulai | Mersin | | |

== B ==
| Name of the settlement | Province | Notes | Image |
|---|---|---|---|
| Beycesultan | Denizli | | |
| Binbirkilise | Karaman | | |
| Carchemish | Gaziantep | Capital of Neo Hittite confederation | |
| Cardia | Çanakkale | | |
| Caryanda | Muğla | | |
| Castabala | Osmaniye | | |
| Çatalhöyük | Konya | | |
| Çayönü | Diyarbakır | | |
| Cebrene | Çanakkale | | |
| Celaenae | Afyon | | |
| Ceramus | Muğla | | |
| Chalcedon | Istanbul | | |
| Charax | Yalova | | |
| Cius | Bursa | Modern town Gemlik | |
| Colophon | İzmir | | |
| Comana | Adana | Capital of Kizzuwatna | |
| Comana Pontica | Tokat | | |
| Corycus | Mersin | | |
| Cremna | Burdur | | |
| Cyme | İzmir | | |
| Cyzicus | Balıkesir | | |
| Dara | Mardin | | |
| Derbe | Konya | | |
| Didyma | Aydın | | |
| Diokaisareia | Mersin | | |
| Docimium | Afyon | | |
| Domuztepe | Kahramanmaraş | | |
| Dorylaeum | Eskişehir | | |
| Drusipara | Kırklareli | | |

== E ==
| Name of the settlement | Province | Notes | Image |
|---|---|---|---|
| Edessa | Şanlıurfa | | |
| Elaiussa Sebaste | Mersin | | |
| Emirzeli | Mersin | | |
| Ephesus | İzmir | Was home to the ancient wonder Temple of Artemis at Ephesus. House of the Virgin Mary is believed to be near the settlement (Mt. Koressos; Turkish: Bülbüldağı). | |
| Epiphania | Mersin | | |
| Erythrae | İzmir | | |
| Euchaita | Çorum | | |
| Euromus | Muğla | | |
| Faustinopolis | Niğde | | |
| Gambrion | İzmir | | |
| Germanicopolis | Bursa | | |
| Gordium | Ankara | Capital of Phrygia | |
| Göbeklitepe | Şanlıurfa | | |
| Gözlükule | Mersin | Modern city Tarsus | |
| Gryneion | İzmir | | |
| Hacilar | Burdur | | |
| Halicarnassus | Muğla | Modern city Bodrum and the home to the ancient wonder Mausoleum of Halicarnassus | |
| Harran | Şanlıurfa | | |
| Hattusa | Çorum | Capital of Hittite Empire | |
| Heraclea Cybistra | Konya | | |
| Hierapolis | Denizli | | |
| Honaz | Denizli | | |
| Hüseyindede Tepe | Çorum | | |
| Hyllarima | Muğla | Religious centre in ancient Caria | |

== I ==
| Name of the settlement | Province | Notes | Image |
|---|---|---|---|
| Ibora | Tokat | | |
| Irenopolis | Karaman (?) | | |
| Issus | Hatay | | |
| Kalehöyük | Kırşehir | | |
| Kandyba | Antalya | | |
| Kanesh (Kültepe) | Kayseri | | |
| Karataş-Semayük | Antalya | | |
| Karatepe | Osmaniye | | |
| Kaunos | Muğla | | |
| Kayaköy | Muğla | | |
| Kerkenes | Yozgat | | |
| Kibyra | Burdur | | |
| Kirshu (Meydancık Castle) | Mersin | | |
| Klazomenai | İzmir | | |
| Knidos | Mugla | | |
| Küstülü-Üçayak | Mersin | | |
| Labraunda | Muğla | | |
| Laodicea Combusta | Konya | | |
| Laodicea on the Lycus | Denizli | | |
| Lamponeia | Çanakkale | | |
| Laodicea Pontica | Samsun | | |
| Latmus | Aydın | | |
| Lebedus | İzmir | | |
| Limantepe | İzmir | | |
| Limnai or Limnae | Çanakkale | | |
| Lysimachia | Çanakkale | | |

== M ==
| Name of the settlement | Province | Notes | Image |
|---|---|---|---|
| Magnesia on the Maeander | Aydın | | |
| Mallus | Adana | | |
| Melid | Malatya | | |
| Mamure Castle | Mersin | | |
| Marpessos | Çanakkale | | |
| Metropolis | İzmir | | |
| Mezgitkale | Mersin | | |
| Miletus | Aydın | Leading city of Ionian League | |
| Mobolla | Mugla | | |
| Mokissos | Kırşehir | | |
| Mopsuestia | Adana | | |
| Mylasa | Muğla | Modern town Milas | |
| Myndus | Muğla | | |
| Myra | Antalya | Modern town Demre | |
| Myriandrus | Hatay | | |
| Myus | Aydın | | |
| Neandreia | Çanakkale | | |
| Nevalı Çori | Şanlıurfa | | |
| Nicomedia | Kocaeli | Modern city İzmit and Capital of Bithynia | |
| Nicopolis | Sivas | | |
| Niksar | Tokat | | |
| Notion | Aydın | | |
| Nysa | Aydın | | |
| Nyssa | Aksaray | | |

== O ==
| Name of the settlement | Province | Notes | Image |
|---|---|---|---|
| Oenoanda | Muğla | | |
| Olba | Mersin | | |
| Olympus | Antalya | | |
| Orestias | Edirne | | |
| Patara | Antalya | | |
| Pepuza | Uşak | | |
| Perga | Antalya | | |
| Pergamon | İzmir | Former capital of the Kingdom of Pergamon | |
| Perperene | İzmir | | |
| Pessinus | Eskişehir | | |
| Phaselis | Antalya | | |
| Phocaea | İzmir | | |
| Pinara | Muğla | | |
| Pitane | İzmir | | |
| Pompeiopolis | Kastamonu | | |
| Priene | Aydın | | |
| Purushanda | Aksaray | | |
| Rhosus | Hatay | | |

== S ==
| Name of the settlement | Province | Notes | Image |
|---|---|---|---|
| Sagalassos | Burdur | | |
| Sakçagözü | Gaziantep | | |
| Samal | Gaziantep | | |
| Samosata | Adıyaman | Capital of Commagene | |
| Sapinuwa | Çorum | | |
| Sardis | Manisa | Capital of Lydia | |
| Seleucia (Pamphylia) | Antalya | | |
| Seleucia Pieria | Hatay | | |
| Seleucia Sidera | Isparta | | |
| Selge | Antalya | | |
| Sestos | Çanakkale | | |
| Side | Antalya | | |
| Sigeion | Çanakkale | | |
| Sillyon | Antalya | | |
| Sinuri | Muğla | Religious centre in ancient Caria | |
| Skepsis | Çanakkale | | |
| Smyrna | İzmir | | |
| Soli | Mersin | | |
| Stratonicea | Manisa | | |
| Stratonicea | Muğla | | |
| Sultantepe | Şanlıurfa | | |

== T ==
| Name of the settlement | Province | Notes | Image |
|---|---|---|---|
| Tapureli | Mersin | | |
| Tavium | Yozgat | | |
| Tabae | Denizli | | |
| Telmessos | Muğla | Modern town Fethiye | |
| Tell Tayinat | Hatay | | |
| Temnos | İzmir | | |
| Teos | İzmir | | |
| Termessos | Antalya | | |
| Tille | Adıyaman | | |
| Tlos | Antalya | | |
| Tokmar Castle | Mersin | | |
| Trapezopolis | Babadağ | | |
| Troy (Hisarlik) | Çanakkale | Troy of Homer. Capital of Wilusa. | |
| Tripolis on the Meander | Denizli | | |
| Tushhan | Diyarbakır | | |
| Tushpa | Van | Capital of Urartu | |
| Tyana | Niğde | | |
| Tymion | Uşak | | |
| Xanthos | Antalya | | |
| Yazılıkaya | Çorum | There are two settlements named Yazılıkaya. The other one (also called Midas city) is in Eskişehir Province. | |
| Yeniyurt Castle | Mersin | | |
| Yumuktepe | Mersin | Modern city Mersin | |
| Zaliches | Samsun | | |
| Zeugma | Gaziantep | | |

== See also ==
- Ancient kingdoms of Anatolia
