= Veyselli rock reliefs =

Roman archaeological site in Turkey

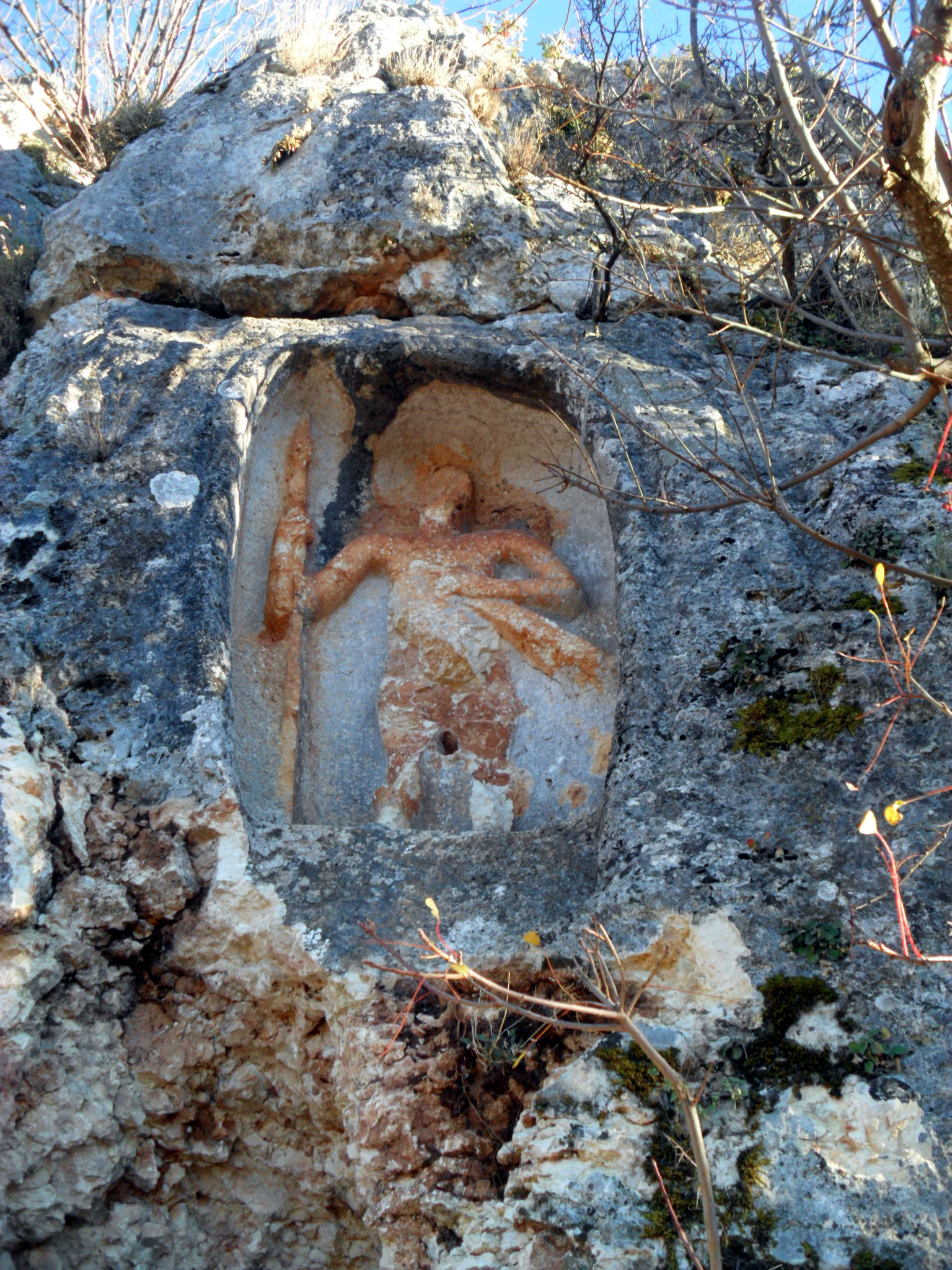
Westernmost figure

Veyselli rock reliefs are a series of four rock reliefs in Erdemli district of Mersin Province, Turkey.

The reliefs are in the rural area between the villages of Yeniyurt and Veyselli at about 36°38'06.7"N 34°06'36.5"E. The distance to Erdemli is 29 kilometres (18 mi) and to Mersin is 65 kilometres (40 mi). But the last 2 kilometres (1.2 mi) is impassable for motor vehicles.

There are four figures; three soldiers and a woman. They are dated to Roman Empire era. Each figure is about 1 metre (3 ft 3 in) tall and had been carved on the northern slope of a hill about 3 metres (9.8 ft) high with respect to ground.
