= Leleg Trail =

Long-distance hiking trail in Turkey

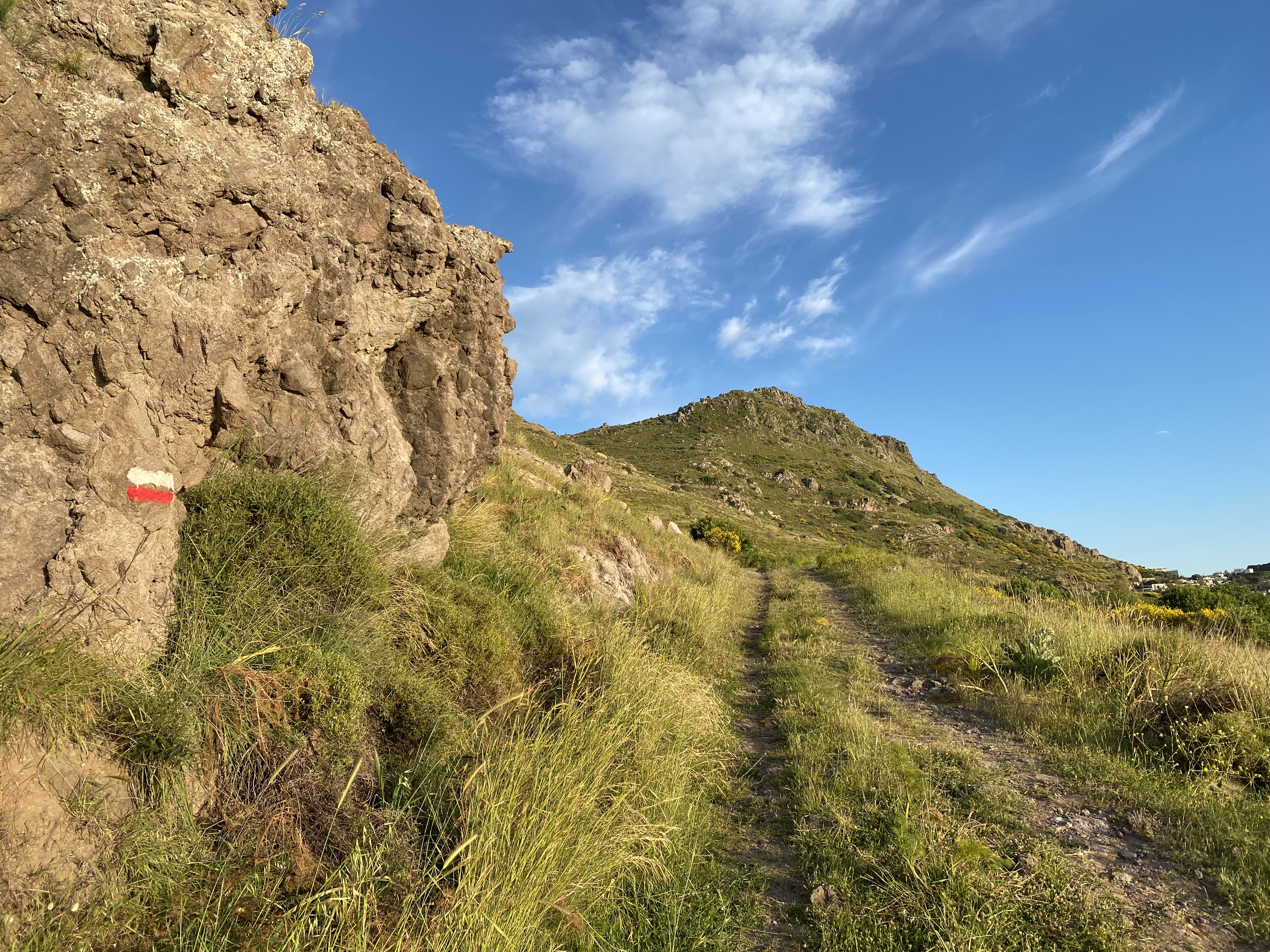
- Length: 88 km (main route); 185 km (with side trails)
- Location: Bodrum Peninsula, Muğla Province, Turkey
- Trailheads: Etrim village to Turgutreis Sabancı Park
- Use: Hiking, mountain biking
- Season: Year-round

The Leleg Trail (Turkish: Leleg Yolu) is a red-and-white marked long-distance hiking trail located on the Bodrum Peninsula in Muğla Province, Turkey. Its first section opened in March 2016.

The trail takes its name from the historical Leleg people (or Leleges), one of the earliest known inhabitants of the Bodrum region. It begins in Etrim village and extends to Turgutreis Sabancı Park (88 km main route), with connecting side trails bringing the total network to 185 km of hiking paths. The project was developed by the Bodrum Chamber of Commerce to extend the local tourism season beyond the summer months and received support from the South Aegean Development Agency. Along the route lie the ancient Leleg city of Pedasa (Pedesa) and other Leleg-associated settlements, as well as historical structures such as Gebe Church (Gebe Kilise). A 20 km mountain-biking trail is also integrated into the system.

== History ==
The Leleg Trail has no direct ancient predecessor; it is a modern hiking route created in the 21st century. However, it was deliberately designed to connect and highlight the archaeological remains of the ancient Leleges, a pre-Greek people associated with the Bodrum Peninsula (ancient Caria). Classical authors such as Homer, Herodotus, and Strabo described the Leleges as indigenous inhabitants of the region who lived in mountain-top settlements before being displaced or absorbed by the Carians and later Greeks. They are linked in particular to sites such as Pedasa, Theangela, Syangela, Termera, and Telmissos.

Modern archaeology has found no distinct “Lelegian” material culture (pottery, architecture, or language) that clearly separates them from their neighbours. A 2023 scholarly study concludes that the Leleges were likely an “imaginary people” — a label that ancient writers used flexibly to refer to the pre-Hellenic indigenous population of Caria, rather than a single ethnic group with a verifiable identity.

The project was officially launched with its first stage in March 2016 (some sources note full sections becoming available around 2017), and it continues to be promoted as a way to discover Bodrum’s ancient heritage beyond the beaches.

== See also ==
- Lycian Way
- Carian Trail
