= Nail Çakırhan =

Turkish poet and journalist (1910–2008)

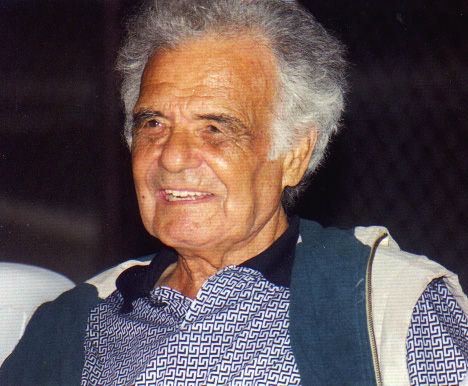
- Arch. Çakırhan in 1998
- Born: 14 July 1910; Ula, Muğla, Ottoman Empire
- Died: 10 October 2008 (aged 98); Muğla, Turkey
- Occupation: Architect
- Buildings: Akyaka traditional Turkish houses

Nail Çakırhan (1910–2008) was a Turkish poet and journalist in his career in the beginning, and later a self-taught and award-winning architect and restorer who left his print particularly in the architecture of the coastal township of Akyaka in southwestern Turkey through old houses he had repaired and restored or new houses built in accordance with the traditional styles and approaches of Turkish/Ottoman/Aegean houses, supplemented with innovative conceptions and designs.

== Early career ==
Nail Çakırhan was born in Ula in southwestern Turkey, and studied in the provincial center of Muğla and later in Konya in Central Anatolia. He started writing poetry while in Konya where he also published a literary magazine named "Kervan", due to which he went into trouble with the police and had to move to Istanbul. During his university years, he changed branch several times, skipping from medicine to law and later to the study of literature. It was during this time that he became a close friend of Nazım Hikmet and he started working as an editor both in the daily Cumhuriyet and in the literary and political journal published by the famous poet, with whom he also published his first book of poetry jointly. He was arrested at the same time as Nazım Hikmet in 1932 and he remained in prison until the beginning of the following year. In 1934, he went to the USSR in secret where he remained until 1937.

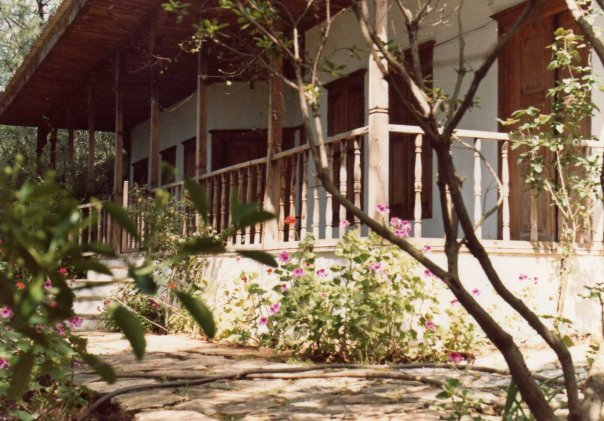
Çakırhan's award-winning own house in Akyaka

Back in Turkey by divorcing from his Russian first wife in 1937 (he was going to be able to see his son only in 1979), he started working in the leftist newspaper "Tan" and married the well-known and respected Olympics pioneer athlete and archaeologist Halet Çambel. Imprisoned again for his Marxist views between 1946 and 1950, he left for Europe with his wife for two years afterwards.

== Architect's career ==
His first venture into the art of architecture came in the 1950s, when he constructed by learning from the scratch and assisted by several professional architects and on the late-Hittite site of Karatepe in southern Turkey, where Mrs. Halet Çambel was conducting excavations, an open-air museum. His obvious talents and his rapid acquisition of the science led him to assume, by the 1960s, the building of the Turkish Historical Society and the German High School in Ankara and once again buildings for the usage of archaeologists in Ergani where Mrs. Halet Çambel was once again managing excavation work.

All at the same time preserving residence in a yalı in the chic Istanbul quarter of Arnavutköy, the couple chose to live on a permanent basis in Akyaka in south-western Turkey as of 1970.

Here, Nail Çakırhan constructed his own house, considered a classic by its blend of characteristics proper to traditional Ottoman/Turkish/Aegean architecture and modern requirements, as well those of its environment. Commands for other constructions from his circle of friends and contacts found him having concretized in a few years a local school of architecture termed under the name of the locality of Akyaka to whose general settlement patterns Çakırhan contributed a lot. He received the Aga Khan Award for Architecture in 1983, principally on the basis of his legacy in Akyaka.

He contributed to the design and construction of several projects in Muğla Province region, notably the restoration of the 18th Konakaltı Caravanserai in the province center, as well as of private houses, hotels and other buildings for the tourism industry.

Nail Çakırhan died on 11 October 2008 in his hometown of Muğla.

== See also ==
- Akyaka, Muğla
- Gulf of Gökova
- Aga Khan Award for Architecture
