= Euthenae =

Coastal town of ancient Caria

Coordinates: 36°55′55″N 28°15′18″E

Euthenae or Euthenai (Ancient Greek: Εὐθηναί) or Euthena was a coastal town of ancient Caria, on the Ceramicus Sinus.

Located 9 km north of Marmaris, likely holds the remains of a Rhodian Peraia settlement, which was associated with the city of Camirus. This site appears to be referenced by Pomponius Mela, Pliny the Elder and Stephanus of Byzantium. At the peak's summit, there is a walled citadel with small forts at both ends. The steep hillside below is covered with tightly packed ruins of a sizable town, constructed on terraces. An epitaph of a local Euthenite was discovered in the nearby village of Ovacik at the base of the hill. The name on the inscription is Νικοκλῆς (Nikokles).

Its site is located near Altınsivrisi, Asiatic Turkey.
