= Azmak Creek =

River in Muğla, Turkey

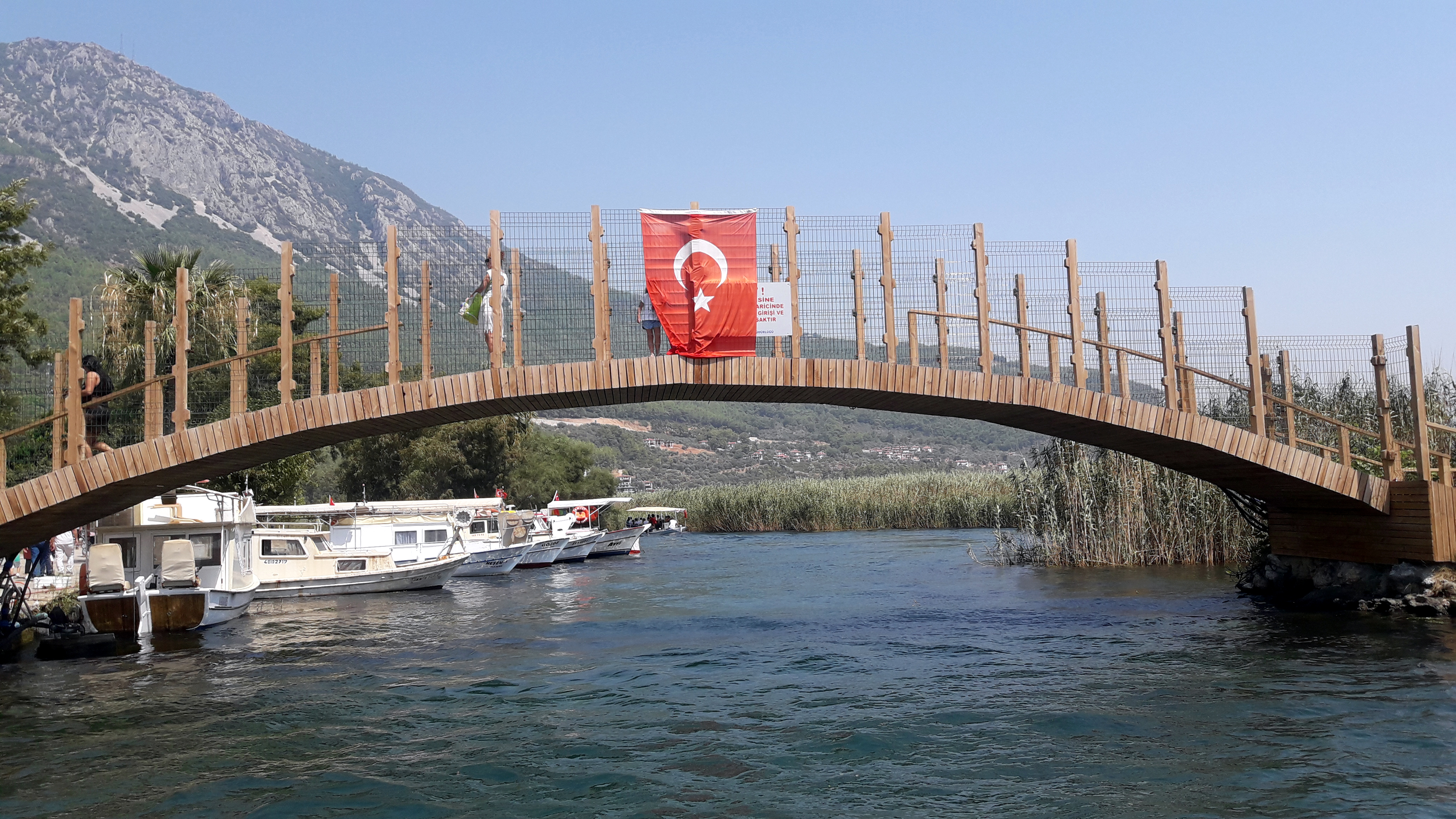

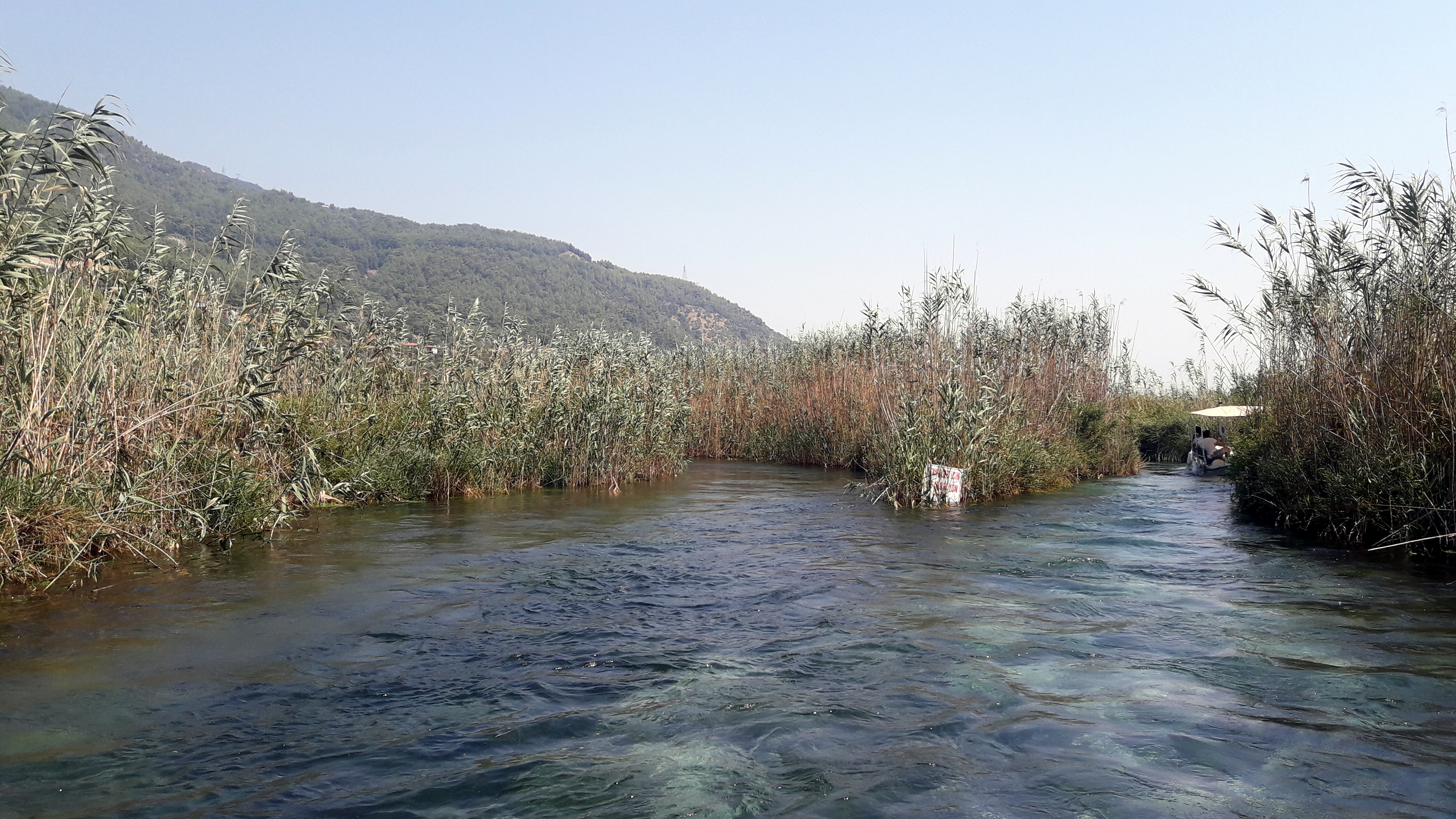

Azmak Creek is a creek in Turkey. It is in Ula ilçe (district) of Muğla Province.

It flows to Gulf of Gökova which is southernmost gulf of the Aegean Sea at 37°02′59″N 28°19′34″E . It is a short creek, but its average flow rate is 700 liters (150 imp gal; 180 U.S. gal) per second which is higher than what is expected in a short creek. The average depth of the creek is about 6 metres (20 ft). The creek is situated to the east of Akyaka a town known for its touristic potential. During summers there are regular excursion boat trips in the creek. Annually, the number of passengers is about a million. The fauna of the creek includes fresh water turtle and Eurasian otter.
