= Carian =

Carian may refer to:

- Caria, a region in Anatolia
- Carians, an ancient Anatolian people
  - Carian language, their now-extinct language
    - Carian alphabets, Greek-derived alphabets used to write the language
    - Carian (Unicode Block), unicode block for writing the language
- Carian Trail, hiking trail in Turkey

== See also ==
- Carrion
