= Bresson =

Bresson may refer to:

- Alain Bresson (born 1949), French classicist
- Robert Bresson (1901–1999), French film director
- Henri Cartier-Bresson (1908–2004), French photographer
- Bresson, Isère, a town in France
