= Hydas =

Inland town of ancient Caria

Coordinates: 36°42′22″N 28°05′34″E

Hydas (Ancient Greek: Ὑδάς), also known as Hyda (Ὑδά), was an inland town of ancient Caria, mentioned by Pliny the Elder.

Its site is located near Selimiye, Asiatic Turkey.
