= Sedir Island =

Island in the Gulf of Gökova, Turkey

Coordinates: 36°59′35″N 28°12′22″E

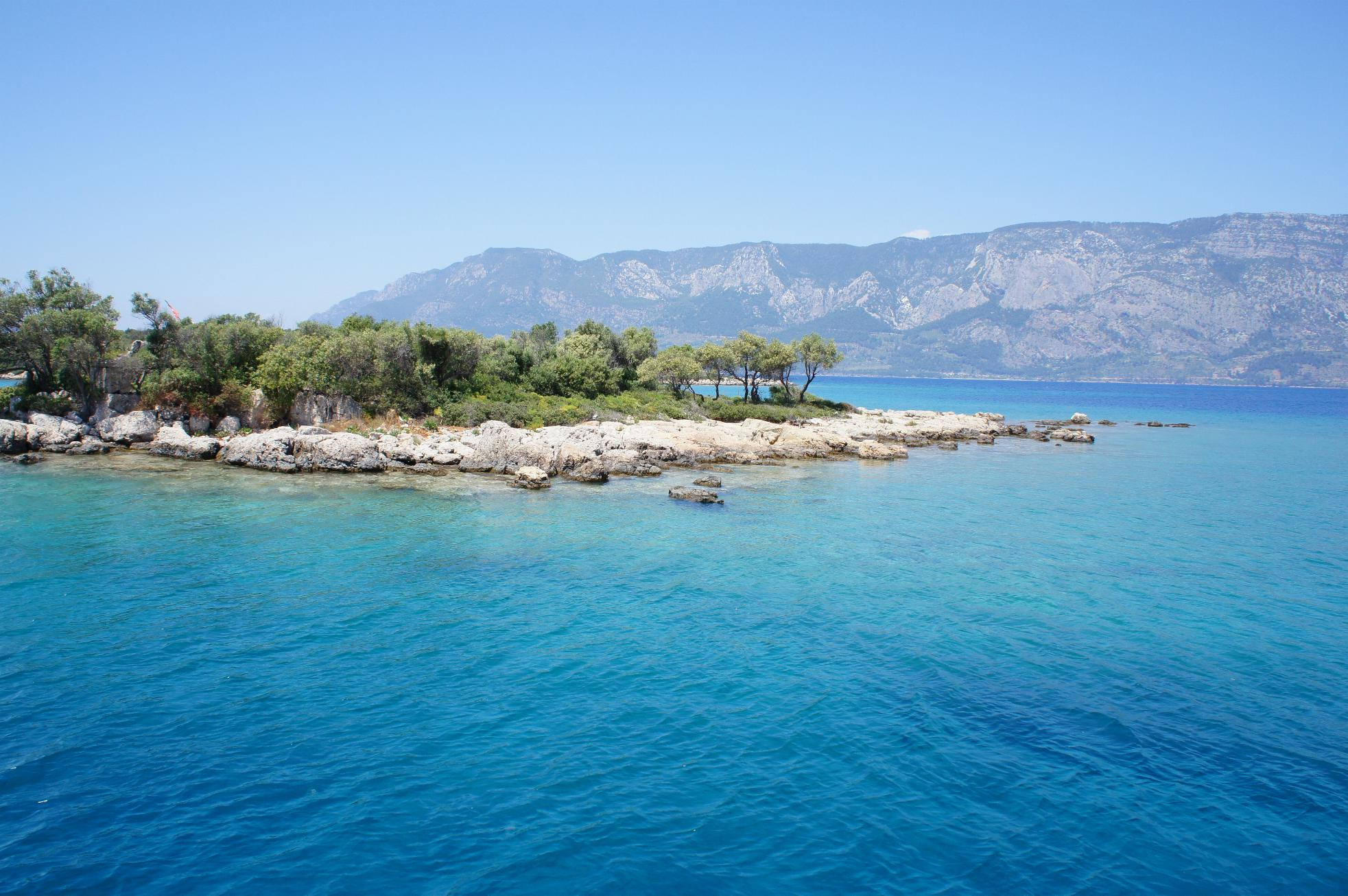
Sedir Island

Sedir Island (Turkish: Sedir Adası), also known as Cleopatra Island, is a small island in the Gulf of Gökova of southeastern Aegean Sea off the coast of Ula, part of Muğla Province of Turkey.

== Beach ==
The island is known for its beach made from seashells. According to legend, Anthony and Cleopatra swam here, and the sands, said to be found only in Egypt, were brought by ships from the Red Sea especially for Cleopatra. Contemporary research suggests the sands are the result of continual erosion of the sandstone bed on site. Each grain of sand is a perfect sphere, for this reason the beach is heavily protected by the government to prevent any sand being removed.

== See also ==
- List of islands of Turkey
