= Ula (Caria) =

Town of ancient Caria

Coordinates: 37°06′04″N 28°22′27″E

Ula or Oula was a town of ancient Caria. Its name does not appear in ancient writers, but is inferred from ancient inscriptions. Oula appears in the Athenian tribute lists and paid an annual tribute of 17 drachmae, 1 obol.

Its site is tentatively identified with Ula ilçe (district) of Muğla Province in Asiatic Turkey.
