= Yeniyurt, Erdemli =

Yeniyurt
- Neighbourhood
- Location in Turkey
- Coordinates: 36°38′N 34°07′E
- Country: Turkey
- Province: Mersin
- District: Erdemli
- Elevation: 875 m (2,871 ft)
- Population (2022): 315
- Time zone: UTC+3 (TRT)
- Postal code: 33730
- Area code: 0324

Yeniyurt is a neighbourhood in the municipality and district of Erdemli, Mersin Province, Turkey. Its population is 315 (2022). It is situated in the peneplane area of the Taurus Mountains. Its distance to Erdemli is 26 kilometres (16 mi) and 62 kilometres (39 mi) to Mersin. The area around the village is full of Roman ruins including a castle and two bridges still used by pedestrians. But the village was founded during the Ottoman era. It was originally a part of Veyselli village. But it 1933 it was issued from Veyselli and was declared a village. The village's main economic activity is farming. Tomato and various other vegetables and fruits are produced.

== See also ==
- Yeniyurt castle
