= Veyselli, Erdemli =

Veyselli
- Neighbourhood
- Location in Turkey
- Coordinates: 36°38′N 34°06′E
- Country: Turkey
- Province: Mersin
- District: Erdemli
- Elevation: 915 m (3,002 ft)
- Population (2022): 369
- Time zone: UTC+3 (TRT)
- Postal code: 33730
- Area code: 0324

Veyselli (former Karafakılı) is a neighbourhood in the municipality and district of Erdemli, Mersin Province, Turkey. Its population is 369 (2022). The village is situated in the Toros Mountains. The distance to Erdemli is 27 kilometres (17 mi) and 63 kilometres (39 mi) to Mersin. The village was founded 150 years ago by a Yörük (once nomadic Turkmen) chief named Veysel. In the 20th century a group of village residents moved southeast to found Yeniyurt a neighbouring village. Later another group moved to Cyprus. Major economic activities are farming and animal breeding. Main produsts are tomato, apple peach and cereals.
