= Akyaka, Ula =

Akyaka
- Neighbourhood
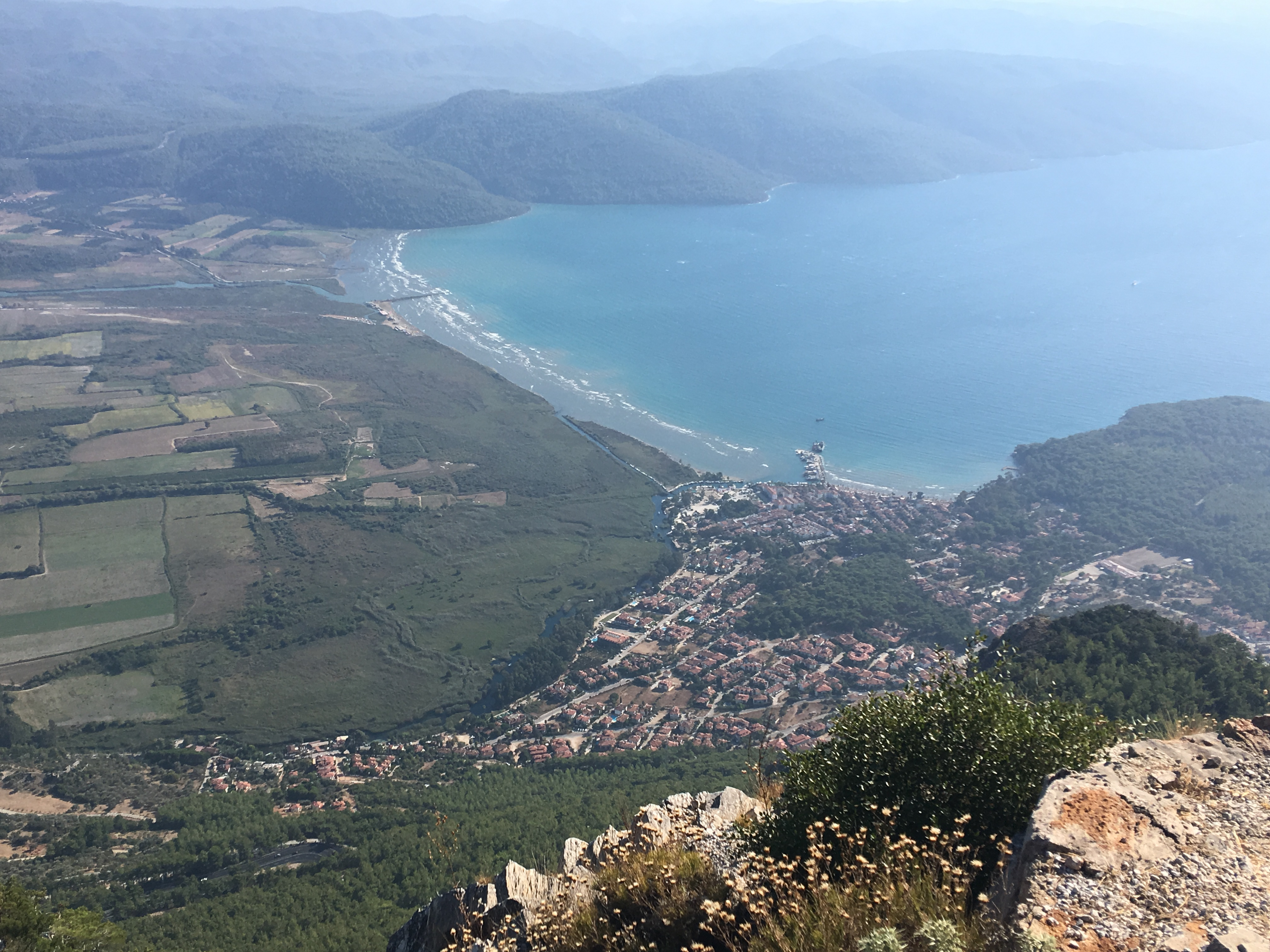
- Akyaka aerial view

- Location within Turkey Location within Turkey Aegean
- Coordinates: 37°03′N 28°19′E
- Country: Turkey
- Province: Muğla
- District: Ula
- Population (2022): 3,147
- Time zone: UTC+3 (TRT)
- Postal code: 48640
- Area code: 0252

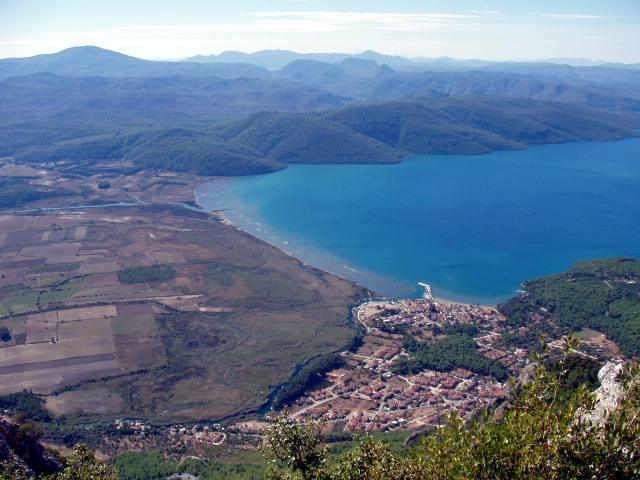
Akyaka general view

Akyaka is a neighbourhood of the municipality and district of Ula, Muğla Province, Turkey. Its population is 3,147 (2022). Before the 2013 reorganisation, it was a town (belde). The town is situated at the far end of the Gulf of Gökova, at the start of the fertile Gökova plain, and is a rising center for international tourism. It is the first coastal town encountered on the busy road from the province center of Muğla to the resort center of Marmaris. Nearby Sakar Pass is a paragliding spot where the road descends from an altitude of 670m to sea-level in the space of a pine-clad section of a dozen kilometers along very sharp curves. At the base of the hill is the intersection to Akyaka.

The township of Akyaka is sometimes referred to as Gökova, after the name of the gulf and the plain, while there is also an inland township of Gökova neighbouring Akyaka, itself of visitor's interest and whose intersection is slightly further ahead from that of Akyaka in the direction of Marmaris.

== History ==
Much of the Gökova plain had been unproductive for centuries, until the later half of the 20th century, and was covered with marshlands ridden with malaria. The inhabitants abandoned their settlements and fields entirely during the months of active malaria and moved to highland plateaus (yayla). The arable land available was usually owned by large landowners from the district center of Ula. An organized program to combat malaria, one of the priorities of the young Turkish Republic of the 1920s, was enacted under a specific law in 1926, in the frame of which ownership titles were awarded to individuals or groups of people on the basis of the swampland they drained, and were quite successful in the transformation of Akyaka region, especially through the local projects lasting from 1925 to 1940. In the following decades, conversion of fields for cash crops, particularly tobacco, dominated the local economy and this until the 1970s when the first steps in the tourism industry were taken. Akyaka became quite cosmopolitan in recent years.

=== Idyma ===
Safe altitude considerations governed the choice for settlements of the ancients as well. Gökova town, inland from Akyaka was the location of the historic city of Idyma, some of whose remains reaching back at least to the 4th century BC, when it was founded as a Carian city, are still visible. Idyma urban zone may have extended as large as the area between the immediate east of Akyaka well beyond the village of Kozlukuyu, a dependent neighborhood of the town of Gökova, 3 km away. The acropolis, city walls 200 meters in length and around fifty rock tombs are located along the steep climb (sea level to 400 meters) of Küçük Sakar at Kozlukuyu. The Acropolis was explored by the French archaeologist Louis Robert in 1937.

In 546 BC, the Persian armies under the command of Harpagus conquered the area, but the Carian customs and the religion remained unchanged. Delian League took over between 484 and 405 BC and Idyma is mentioned in the tax lists for the years 453-452 BC, the earliest written document on the city. The same reports mention a local sovereign by the name of Paktyes, whose descendants may have founded a dynasty which governed Idyma and to whose members the rock tombs could be attributable. A mint city, Idyma produced its own coins, one side of which was marked with the name Idimion, and the other side with the head of a Pan, hinting at a shepherd's cult.

From 167 BC to at least the 2nd century AD, Idyma, together with the entire region south of Muğla (Mobolla) was part of the Rhodes's mainland possessions (Peræa Rhodiorum). A Byzantine castle worth restoring also stands on the slopes of Sakar and a tunnel leads to the bank of the stream of Azmakdere or Kadın Azmak, possibly named Idymus in ancient times.

Because of the extent of the ancient site, in terms both of its area and longevity, some of its archaeological finds are associated with Akyaka, while many with Gökova and particularly Kozlukuyu.

== Azmak Stream ==
Azmak is the name in short of a short but deep stream which joins the sea in Akyaka and formed by springs extending about two miles from East to West. Its depth allows boats to ascend it for a considerable distance and the richness of its underwater fauna made it a favorite spot for daily boat tours around Akyaka and for scuba diving. The water is cold and slightly salty due its level course with the sea across the plain, but watercress and celery thrive in Azmak and restaurants along its course make the stream a symbol and an important point of attraction for Akyaka region.

The word "azmak", sometimes used to describe a river, means "running wild" in Turkish, in a reference to the stream's strong, rather than violent, current, especially in winter. Akyaka's azmak is also referred to under the fuller name of "Kadın Azmak", qualifying it with female attributes and distinguishing it from azmak of Akçapınar at the opposite side of the same plain, or from namesakes in Gallipoli Peninsula or Bulgaria.

== Architecture ==
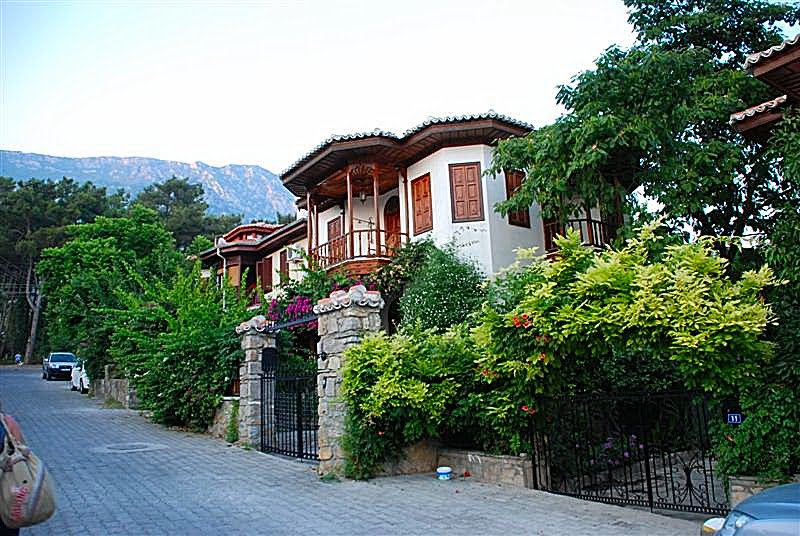
Architecture in the Mugla houses as seen in the wood handcrafted shutters, balconies, doors and roof

Akyaka district is featured with its architectural structure and applies a uniform construction regulation. Thus, the district has formed a distinct building structure exclusive to Akyaka by combining the style of former Ula houses, an old town near the provincial capital of Muğla, which provided the inspiration for the architecture of Akyaka, with modern architecture style. These flowery gardened double stair houses were designed with wooden balconies and overhanging roofs. The ceiling decorations are also notable at Akyaka, which is known for its authentic houses.

The architectural style of Akyaka houses was created by Nail Çakırhan.

== See also ==
- Nail Çakırhan
- Gulf of Gökova
- Turkish Riviera
- Blue Cruise
- Foreign purchases of real estate in Turkey

== Sources ==
- Peter Benedict (1974). Ula : An Anatolian Town. Brill Publishers. ISBN 978-90-04-03882-0.
- George E. Bean (1971). Turkey beyond the Maeander. Frederick A. Praeger, London. ISBN 978-0-87471-038-0.
