= Idyma =

Ancient town in Turkey, now part of Gökova

Coordinates: 37°03′34″N 28°22′02″E

Idyma (Ancient Greek: Ἴδυμα), or Idymus or Idymos (Ἴδυμος), was a coastal town of ancient Caria, strategically placed at the head of a gulf, near the Idymos (Ἴδυμος) river. It is located in the modern town of Gökova.

== History ==
=== Classical Age ===
==== Persian Period ====
In 546 BCE, the Persian armies under the command of Harpagos conquered the area, but the Carian customs and the religion remained unchanged. The Delian League took over between 484 and 405 BCE and Idyma is mentioned in the tax lists for 453/2 BCE, the earliest written documentation of the city. The same reports mention a local sovereign by the name of Paktyes, whose descendants may have founded a dynasty which governed Idyma and to whose members the rock tombs could be attributable. The phoros (tribute) imposed by Athens on Idyma was 114 drachmae, 5 obol. Idyma produced its own coins, one side of which was marked with the name Idimion (ΙΔΥΜΙΟΝ), and the other side with the head of Pan, hinting at a shepherd's cult.

==== Hellenistic and Roman Periods ====
From 167 BCE to at least the 2nd century CE, Idyma, together with the entire region south of modern Muğla was part of the Rhodes's mainland possessions (Peræa Rhodiorum).

Its site is located near Kozlukuyu, Asiatic Turkey. It remains an archaeological site today. The city walls 200 metres (660 ft) in length and around fifty rock tombs are located along the steep climb (sea level to 400 metres (1,300 ft)) of Küçük Sakar. The acropolis was explored by the French archaeologist Louis Robert in 1937.
