= Ula, Muğla =

Ula
- District and municipality
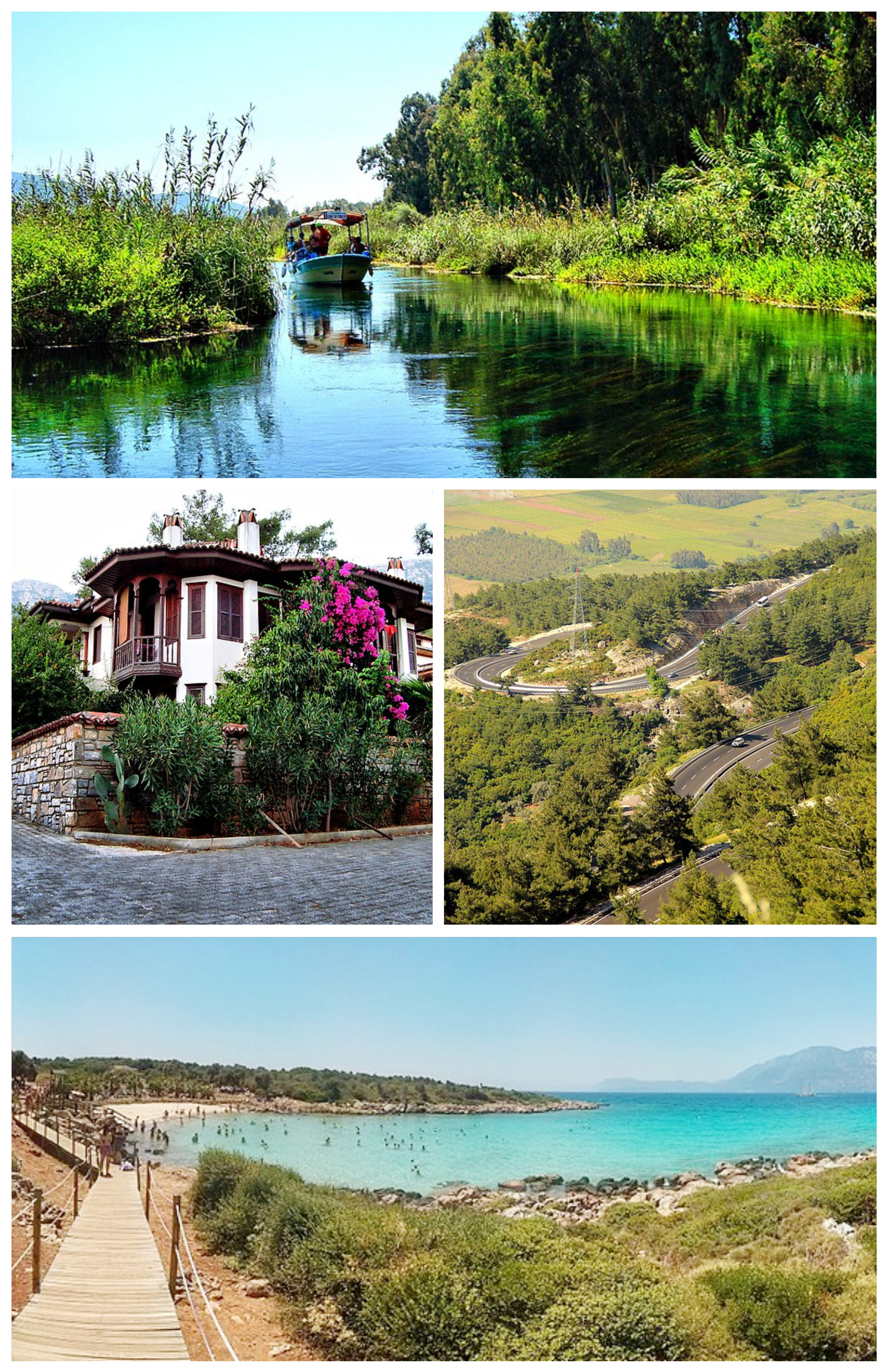
- Clockwise: Azmak Creek, Sakar Pass, Sedir Island & Cleopatra Beach, Traditional houses in Akyaka

- Map showing Ula District in Muğla Province

- Location within Turkey Location within Turkey Aegean
- Coordinates: 37°06′13″N 28°24′53″E
- Country: Turkey
- Province: Muğla

Government
  - Mayor: Mehmet Caner (CHP)
- Area: 479 km^{2} (185 sq mi)
- Population (2022): 26,613
  - Density: 55.6/km^{2} (144/sq mi)
- Time zone: UTC+3 (TRT)
- Postal code: 48640
- Area code: 0252
- Website: www.ula.bel.tr

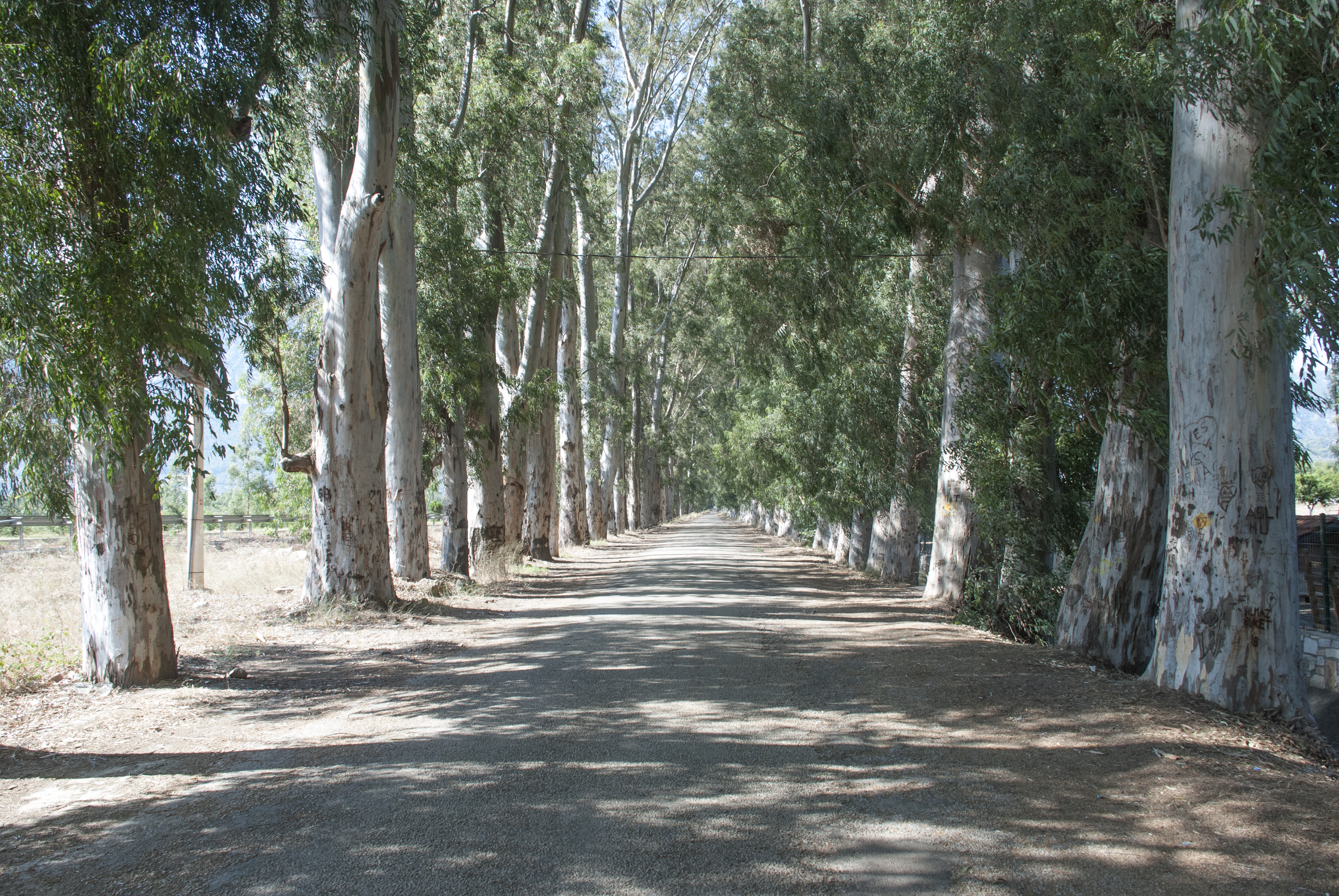
Eucalyptus Tunnel in Ula District

Ula is a municipality and district of Muğla Province, Turkey. Its area is 479 km^{2}, and its population is 26,613 (2022). Its name reflects the ancient town of Ula in ancient Caria, whose site is conjectured to be nearby.

The town of Ula is situated at a distance of only 14 km (9 mi) from the province seat of Muğla, a mile after a bifurcation on the road to Marmaris. It is notable for its old houses in the Turkish style and the vast forest region that extends to the south along the country road called Çiçekli after the town. The history of the inhabitants and the town, situated in ancient Caria, can be traced at least as far back as the dynasty of Menteşe.

The towns of Akyaka and Gökova, situated at a close distance to each other at the tip of the Gulf of Gökova, are both rising centers of international tourism.

== Composition ==
There are 25 neighbourhoods in Ula District:

- Akçapınar
- Akyaka
- Alparslan
- Arıcılar
- Armutçuk
- Ataköy
- Ayazkıyı
- Çiçekli
- Çıtlık
- Çörüş
- Demirtaş
- Elmalı
- Esentepe
- Gökçe
- Gökova
- Gölcük
- Karaböğürtlen
- Kavakçalı
- Kıyra
- Kızılağaç
- Kızılyaka
- Köprübaşı
- Örnekköy
- Portakallık
- Sarayyanı
- Şirinköy
- Turgut
- Yaylasöğüt
- Yeşilçam
- Yeşilova

== Education ==
There are 2 kindergartens, 12 primary schools, 7 secondary schools, 3 high schools, 1 public education center, and 1 teacher's house and art school with the Ministry of National Education in the district.

== See also ==
- Sedir Island
