= Gökova =

- Neighbourhood
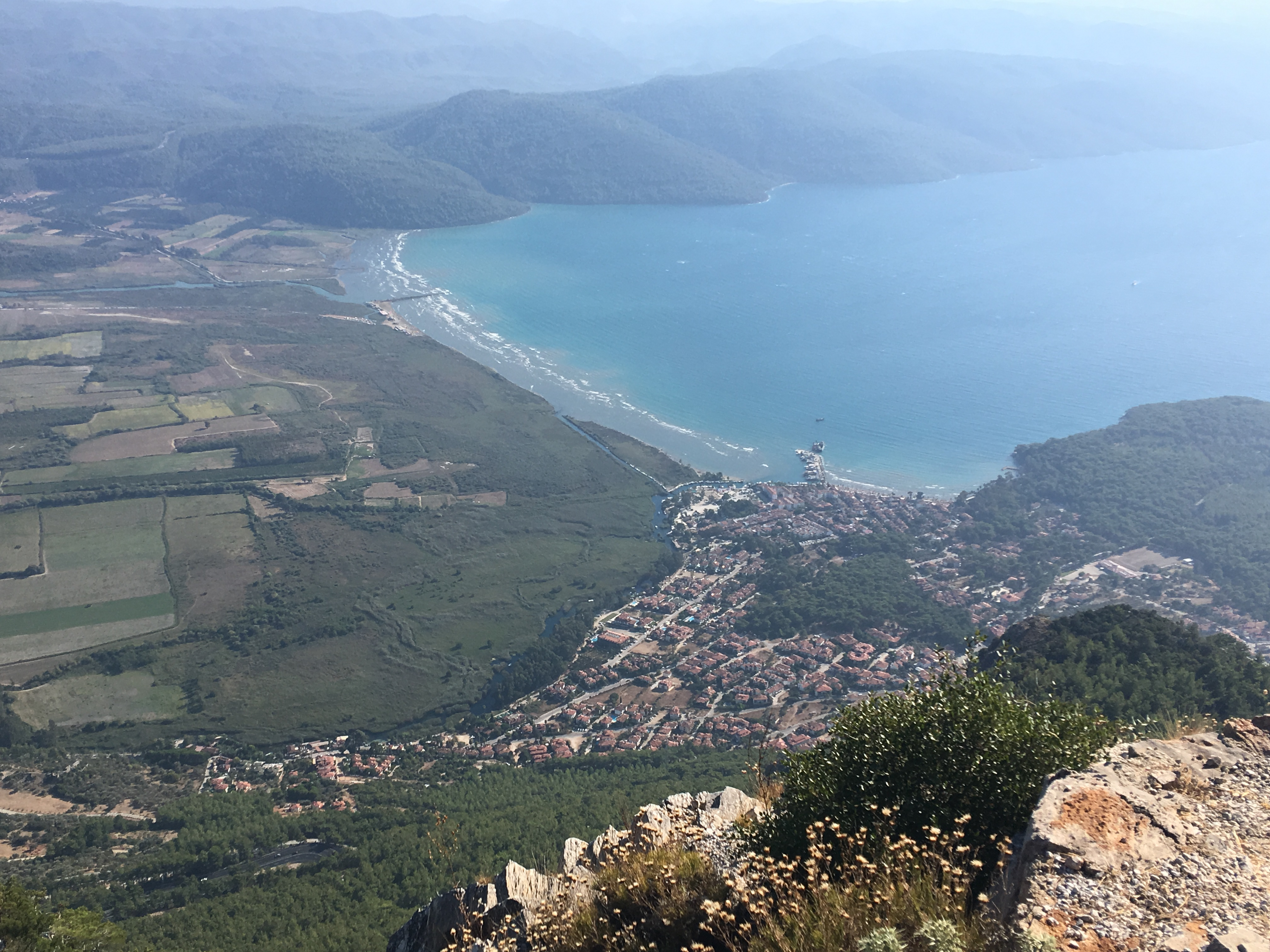
- The Gulf of Gökova

- Location within Turkey Location within Turkey Aegean
- Coordinates: 37°03′15″N 28°21′57″E
- Country: Turkey
- Province: Muğla
- District: Ula
- Population (2022): 2,098
- Time zone: UTC+3 (TRT)
- Postal code: 48640
- Area code: 0252

Gökova is a neighbourhood of the municipality and district of Ula, Muğla Province, Turkey. Its population is 2,098 (2022). Before the 2013 reorganisation, it was a town (belde). It lies at the head of the Gulf of Gökova in a plain also known as Gökova. The ancient Carian city of Idyma, with its acropolis and necropolis, is located above Kozlukuyu Mahallesi (Kozlukuyu Neighbourhood) at the northern end of Gökova town, not at nearby Akyaka as often incorrectly stated.

== Name and geography ==
The "Paktyes" Rock Tomb at Kozlukuyu, Gökova Town

The name Gökova means "blue" (gök) "plain" (ova) and refers to the plain on which the town of Gökova is situated. Today in the plain of Gökova there are two towns called Gökova and Akyaka, six villages named Ataköy, Akçapinar, Gökçe, Çitlik, Şirinköy and Yeşilova. The population is about 10,000.

Gökova town is situated about 2 km inland from the holiday resort of Akyaka. Gökova town is a separate municipality from Akyaka, yet Idyma's acropolis and necropolis are often erroneously attributed to Akyaka. However, there is relatively little of archaeological interest in Akyaka. Gökova town's Kozlukuyu Mahallesi is a first degree archaeological area with the ruins and rock cut chamber tombs of Idyma dating to 5th Century BC.

== History ==
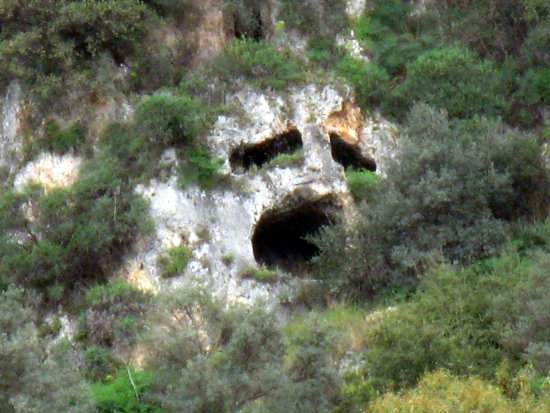
The Rock Tomb known locally as "The Scream" at Kozlukuyu, Gökova Town

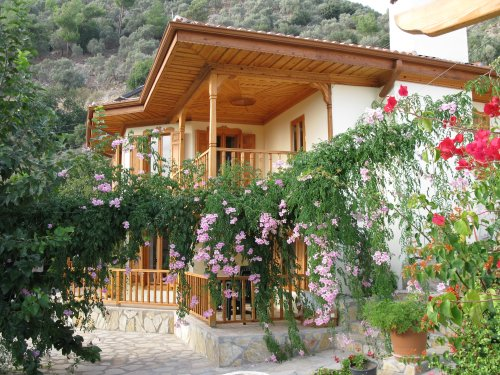
Traditional Turkish house built 150 years ago in Gökova Town

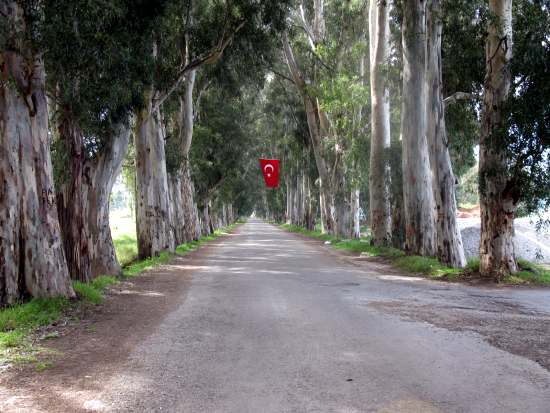
The Gökova "Eucalyptus Tunnel" in Gökova Municipality which is also often mistakenly attributed to Akyaka

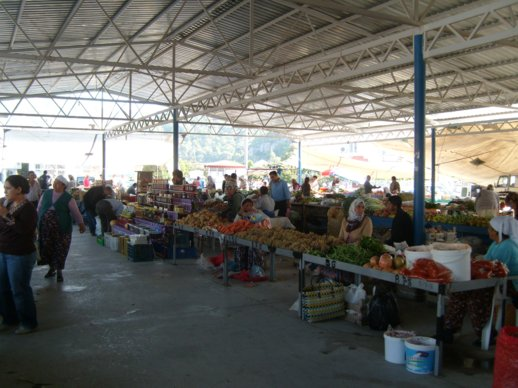
The Gökova Town Saturday Market

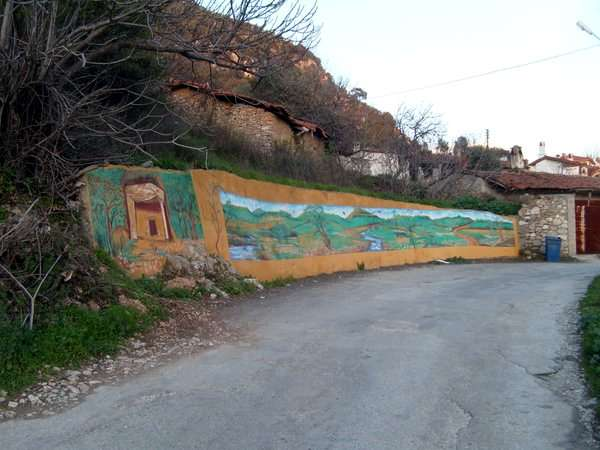
The Gökova Mural at Kozlukuyu showing the famous Gökova roadsıde tombs

The first recorded mention of Idyma (now Gökova) was in 546 BC. as a member of the Attika-Delos Sea Union founded against the Persians with the leadership of Athens. Idyma became a member of the Union by paying 1 Talent and 890 Drachmas in taxes. Idyma minted its own silver coins in the second half of the 5thC BC. The coins show the name IDIMION and the head of the God Pan on the reverse side.

Gökova was, until 1999, a village governed by a mukhtar. In 1999 it became a township or municipality with an elected mayor by a decision made by the Council of Ministers in November 1998. In the first local elections in April 1999, Mayor Durmus Ali Sazakli was elected. The Belediye [town council] has four civil servants and a small staff which may be expanded in the future. The township covers an area of 1,900,000 sq. metres.

As the area of Kozlukuyu, lying directly at the foot of the Idyma necropolis, is now a first degree archaeological area, new building permission is naturally refused. There is no direct route to either the acropolis or necropolis, both of which can only be reached by climbing.

Gökova town consists largely of Gökova, Kozlukuyu, Yazılıtaş and Çaydere. The world-famous Okaliptus Tuneli or Eucalyptus Tunnel which is part of Gökova Municipality - refers to the original route from Gökova town's 'Dört Yol' [meaning Four Roads - the main road junction in the plain] to Marmaris which pre-world war two was lined on both sides with eucalyptus trees. The area was mainly swampland and the then governor of Muğla had the trees planted to dry up the swamps. The Okaliptus Tuneli is around 1.5 km in length.

Gökova has the largest open market in the area. The market was until a few years ago, situated at the north end of Gökova and is still referred to by the traders as Kozlukuyu Pazarı rather than Gökova Pazarı. Since 2007 the produce stalls have been covered by a permanent roof and on days other than market day, the area serves to accommodate weddings and other social events. Gökova Town is famous for the Carian city of Idyma, the Idyma acropolis, necropolis and roadside tombs some of which like other Gökova features are often shown mistakenly on Akyaka's advertising and more recently for its wall and road-bridge paintings by a local artist.

Gökova Belediyesi has a website covering all aspects of Gökova Town and a new website for the Gökova Environment Group [Gökova Cevre Grubu] both of which are listed below.
