= Mobolla =

Ancient Carian town

Coordinates: 37°13′29″N 28°22′53″E

Mobolla (Ancient Greek: Μοβωλλα) was a town of ancient Caria, in the Rhodian Peraia. The name is not attested in history, but is derived from epigraphic and other evidence.

Its site is occupied by the modern town of Muğla, Asiatic Turkey.
