= Selimiye, Marmaris =

Selimiye
- Neighbourhood
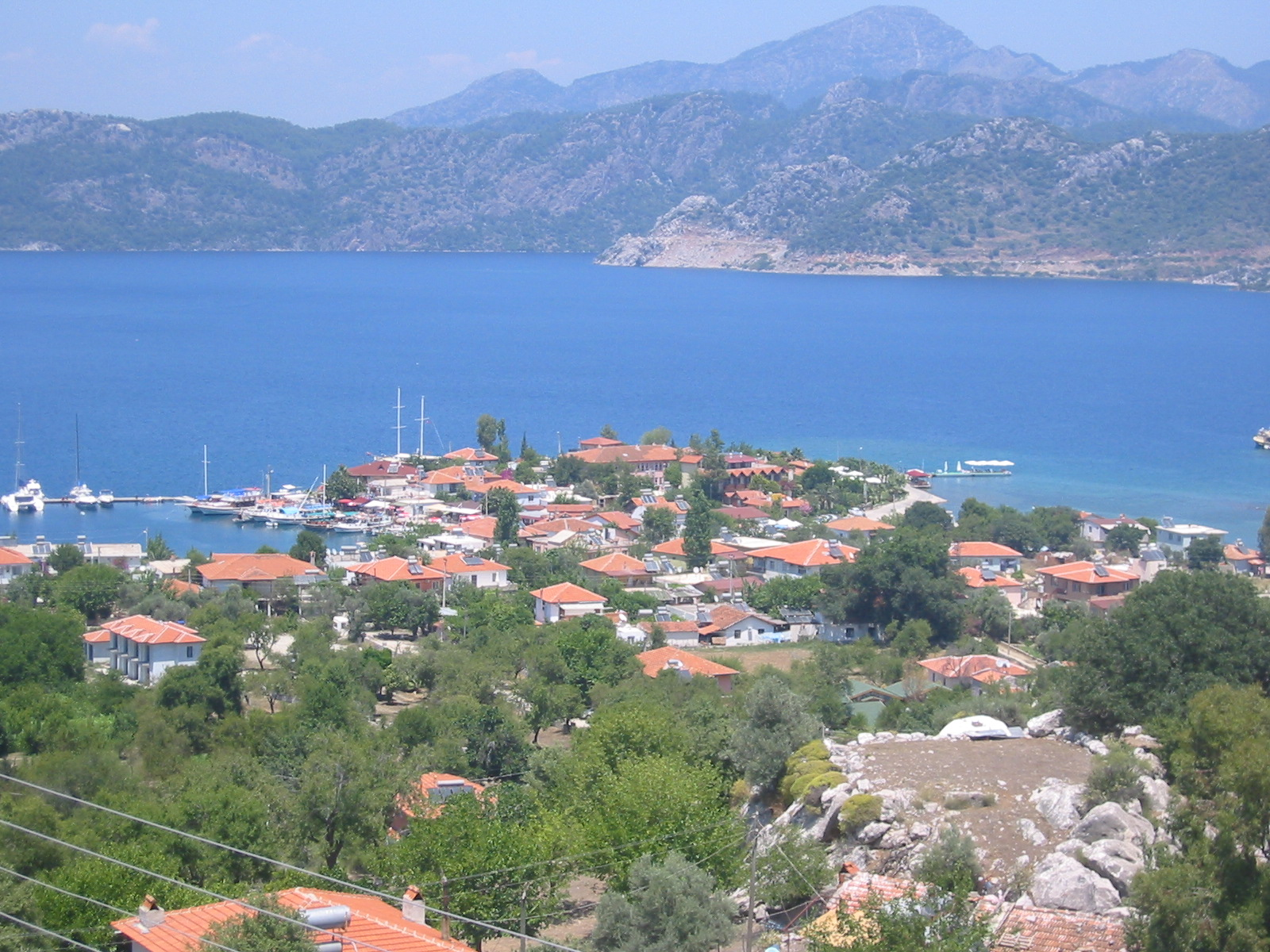

- Location within Turkey Location within Turkey Aegean
- Coordinates: 36.70683°N 28.09383°E
- Country: Turkey
- Province: Muğla
- District: Marmaris
- Population (2022): 1,308
- Time zone: UTC+3 (TRT)

Selimiye is a neighbourhood of the municipality and district of Marmaris, Muğla Province, Turkey. Its population is 1,308 (2022). It lies in the Bozburun Peninsula.
