= Ceramus =

Former city in what is now Turkey

Coordinates: 37°02′33″N 27°57′05″E

Ceramus or Keramos (Ancient Greek: Κέραμος) is a city on the north coast of the Ceramic Gulf—named after this city—in ancient Caria, in southwest Asia Minor; its ruins can be found outside the modern village of Ören, Muğla Province, Turkey.

== History ==
Ceramus, initially subjected to Stratonicea, afterwards autonomous, was a member of the Athenian League and was one of the chief cities of the Chrysaorian League (Bulletin de corresp. hellén., IX, 468). It probably had a temple of Zeus Chrysaoreus. In Roman times, it coined its own money.

Polites (Ancient Greek: Πολίτης) of Ceramus was a famous runner who won three different races in the same day at the Olympia.

== Ecclesiastical history ==
Ceramus is mentioned in the Notitiae Episcopatuum until the 12th or 13th century as a bishopric suffragan to Aphrodisias, or Stauropolis. Three bishops are known: Spudasius (Σπουδάσιος), who attended the First Council of Ephesus in 431; Maurianus (Μαυριανός), who attended the Council of Nicaea in 787; and Symeon (Συμεών), who attended the council in Constantinople that reinstated Photius in 879.

Ceramus is included in the Catholic Church's list of titular sees.

== Ancient coins ==
Ancient coins

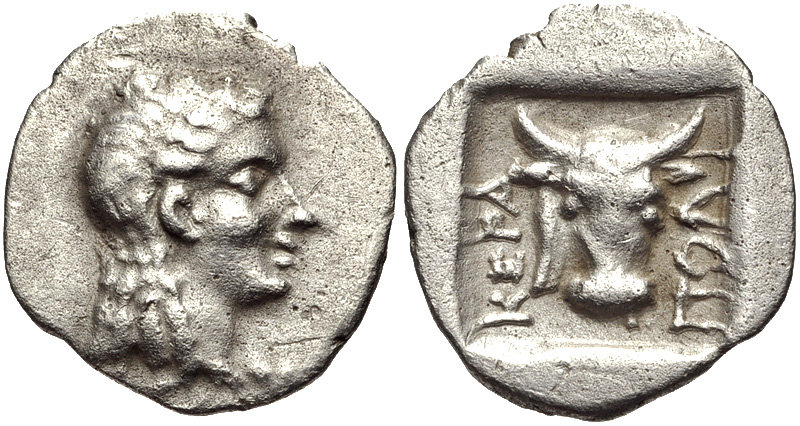
Obol from Ceramus. It has the head of the god Apollo and a Bucranium, 2 BC.

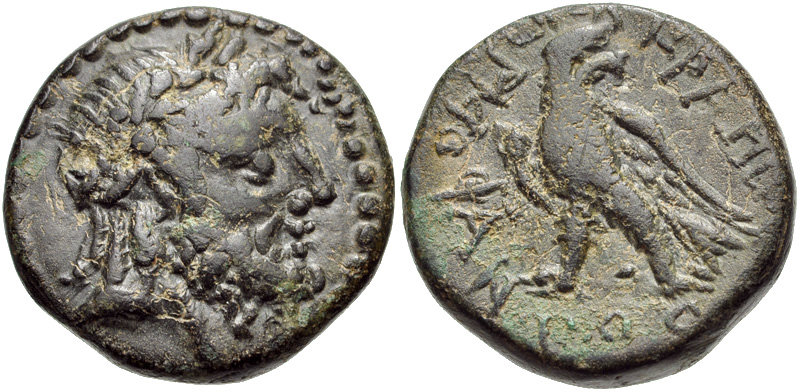
Coin depicting the god Zeus Chrysaoreus and an eagle, 1 AD - 2 AD

== Gallery ==
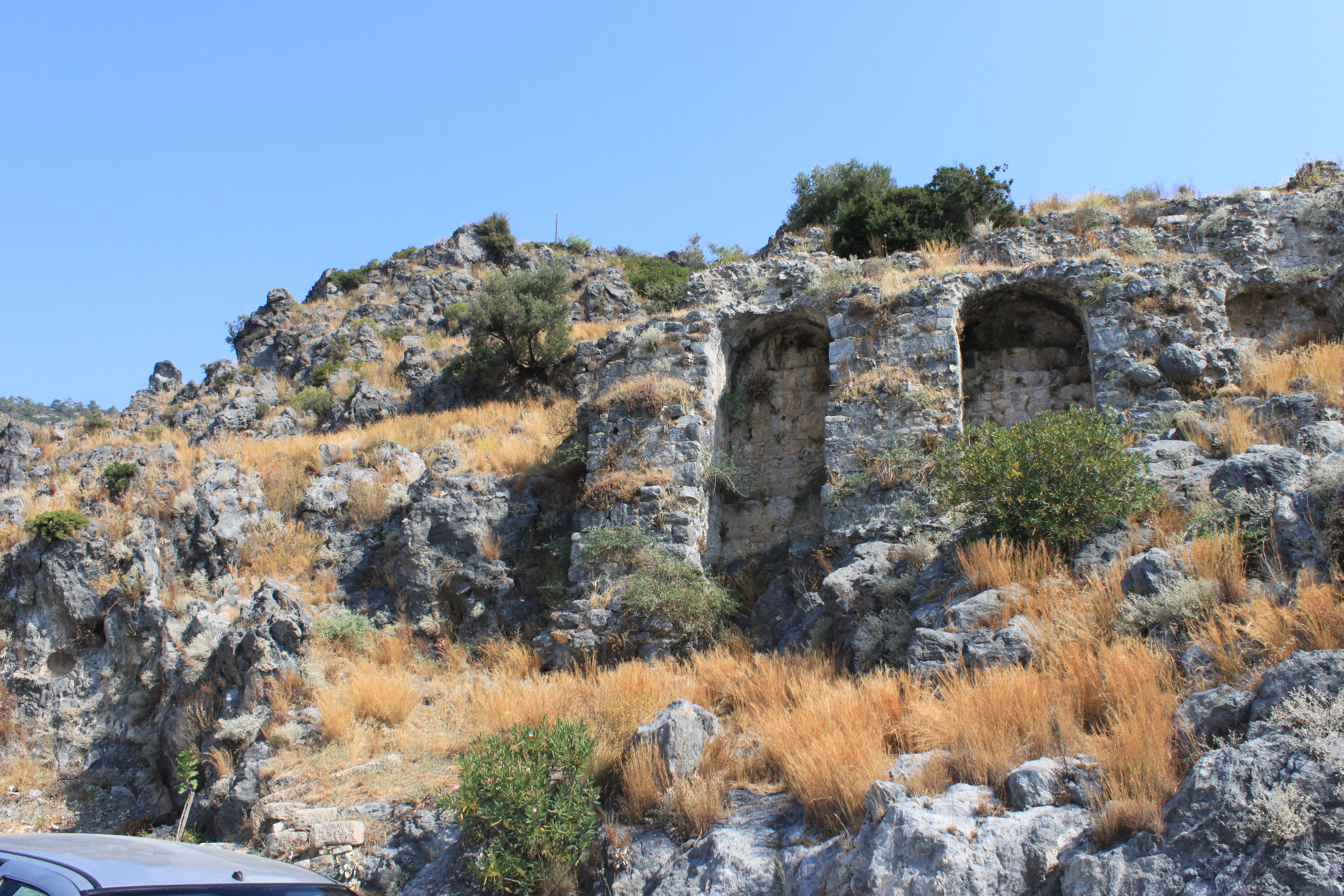
Roman ruins, approx. 1st to 2nd century AD

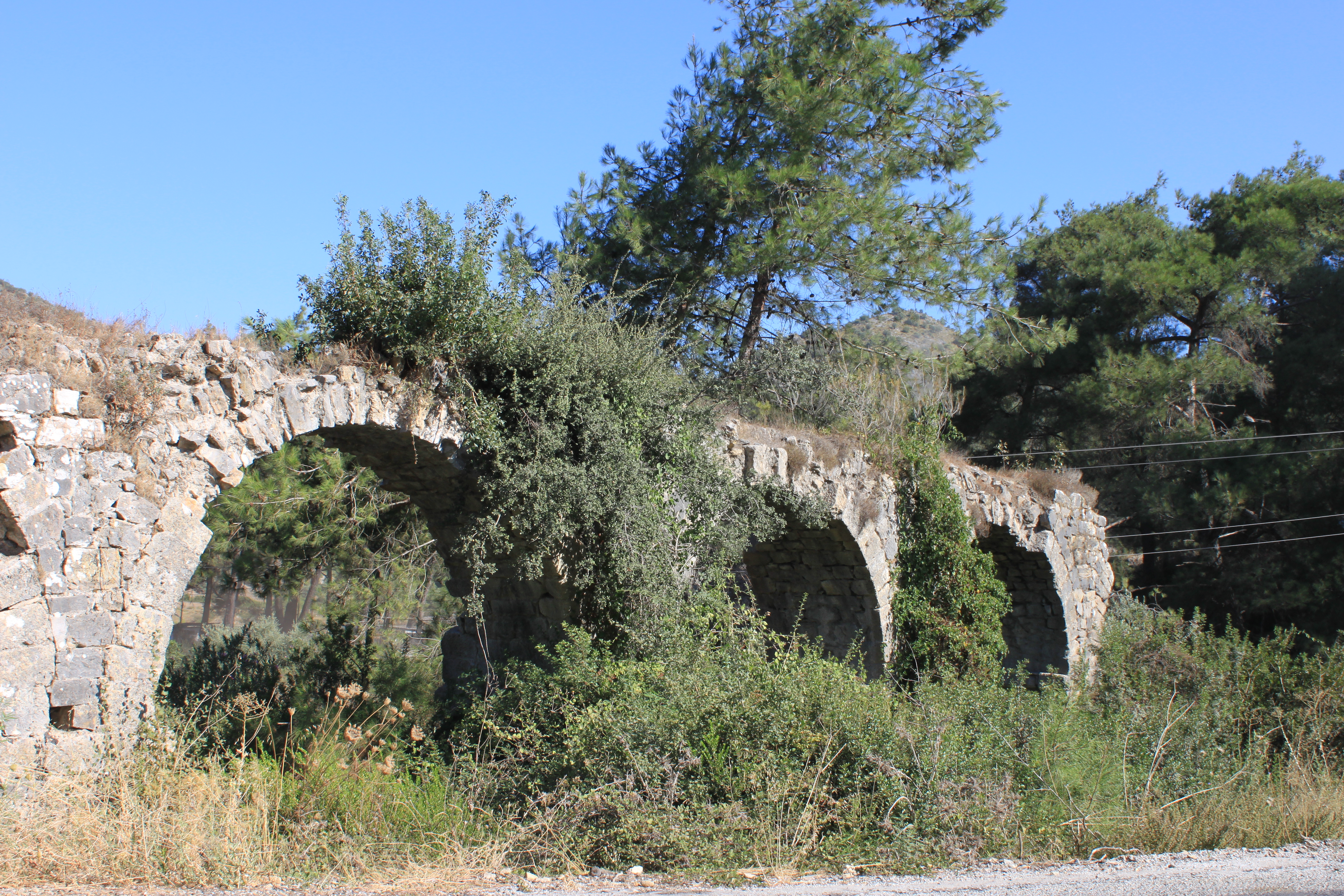
Roman bridge east of Keramos; approx. 1st to 2nd century AD

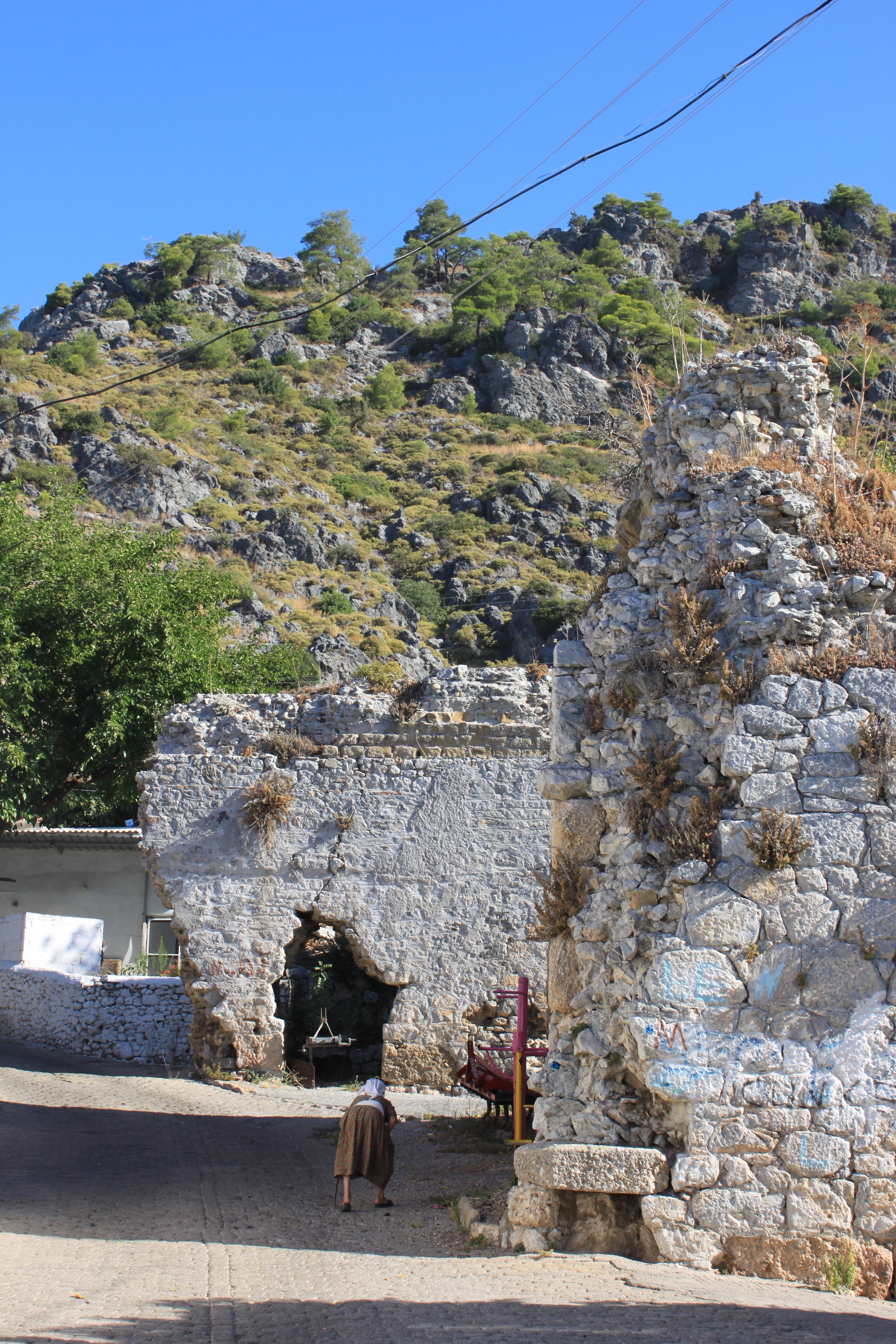
Greek fortifications from pre-Christian times in the village of Ören

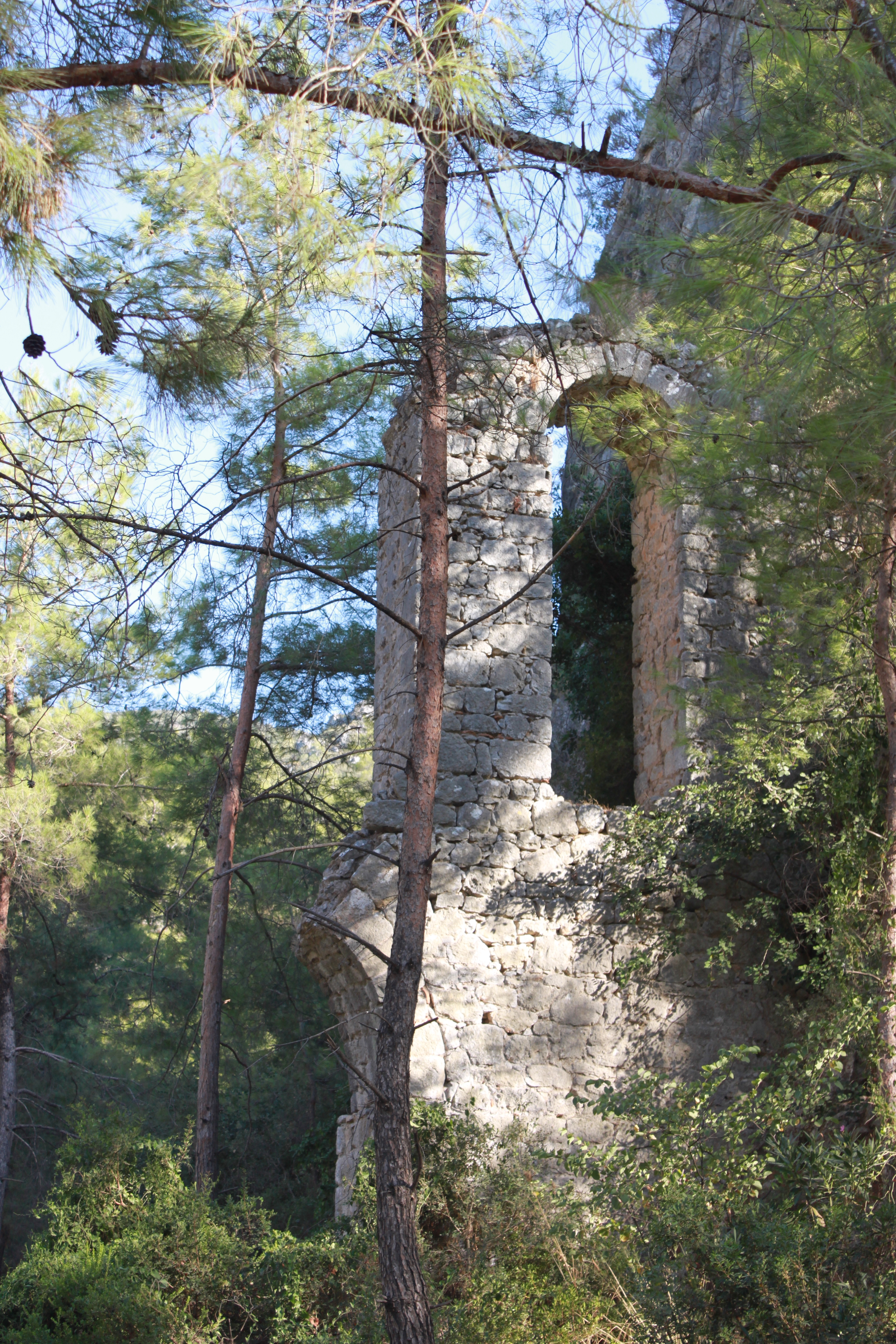
Roman viaduct; approx. 1st to 2nd century AD near Ören

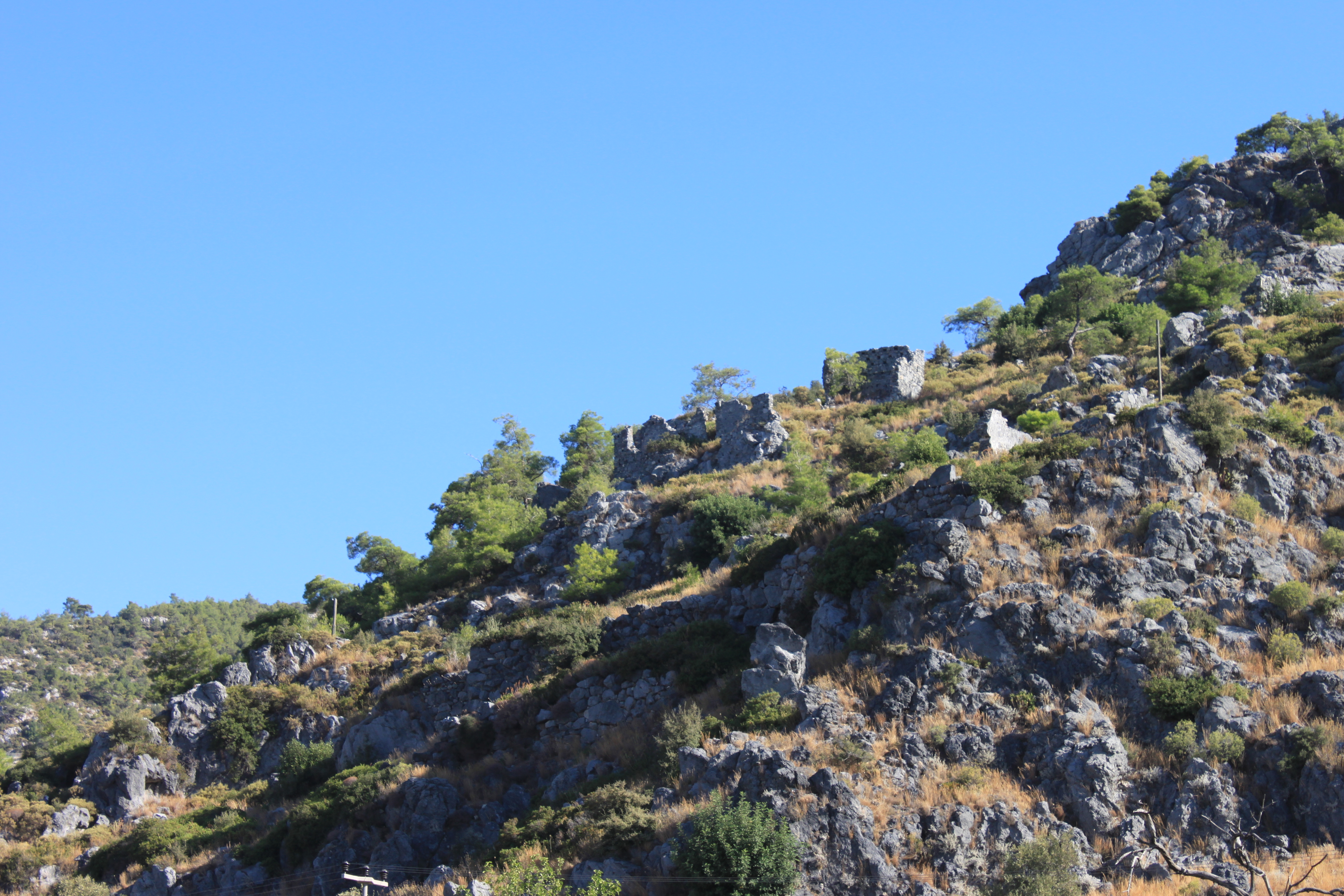
Roman ruins in the north of Keramos, approx. 2nd century AD
