= Pedasa =

Town of ancient Caria

Coordinates: 37°04′05″N 27°25′18″E

Pedasa (Ancient Greek: Πήδασα or τὰ Πήδασα), also known as Pedasus or Pedasos (Πήδασος), and as Pedasum, was a town of ancient Caria. It was a polis (city-state) by c. 400 BCE. Alexander the Great deprived the place of its independence by giving it over to the Halicarnassians, together with five other neighbouring towns.

It was a member of the Delian League.

Its site is near the modern Gökçeler, Muğla province of Turkey.

== People ==
- Hermotimus of Pedasa, favourite eunuch of Xerxes the Great
