= Alain Bresson =

French classicist (born 1949)

Alain Bresson (born 1949) is a French classicist.

Bresson completed a Doctorat d'État at the University of Franche-Comté in 1994, and began his teaching career at the University of Bordeaux. From 2008, he taught at the University of Chicago, where he held the Robert O. Anderson Distinguished Service Professorship. From 2010 to 2011, Bresson was the Marta Sutton Weeks Faculty Fellow at Stanford University. In 2018, Bresson received a Guggenheim fellowship.

== Selected publications ==
- Bresson, Alain (2016). The Making of the Ancient Greek Economy: Institutions, Markets, and Growth in the City-States. Translated by Rendall, Steve. Princeton University Press. doi:10.2307/j.ctt21c4v6h. ISBN 9780691144702.
