= Yeniyurt Castle =

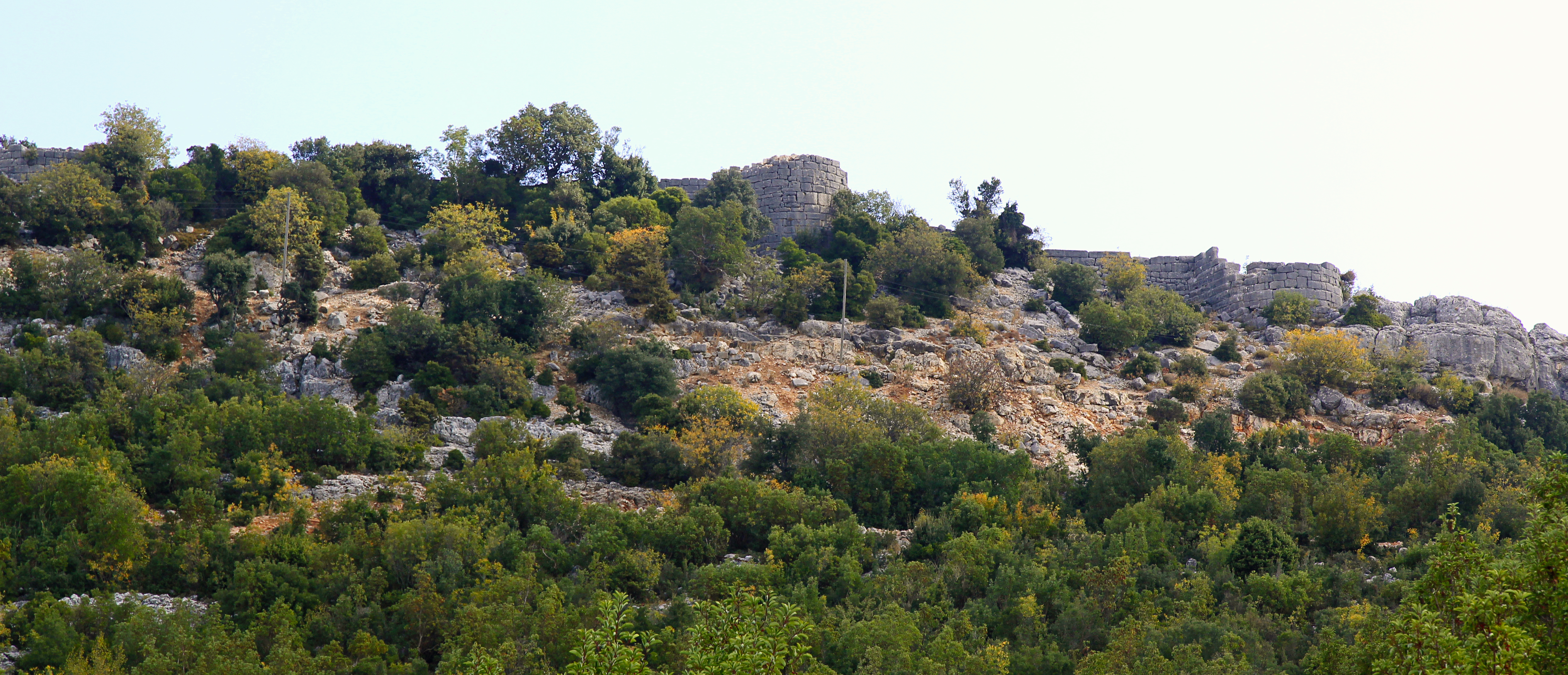
Yeniyurt Castle

Yeniyurt Castle (Turkish: Yeniyurt Kalesi) is a castle ruin in Mersin Province, Turkey. The ancient name of the castle is not known. Yeniyurt is the name of a nearby village.

== Geography ==
The castle is situated on a hill in the peneplane area in the north west of Erdemli district of Mersin Province at 36°37′35″N 34°07′49″E. The castle overviews the Kayacı valley and Limonlu River. The distance to Erdemli is 25 kilometres (16 mi) and to Mersin is 60 kilometres (37 mi) It is 20 kilometres (12 mi) to the nearest sea side settlement, Ayaş.

== The castle ==
The castle, now mostly in ruins, is noticeable for its non-standard construction material. It was a Hellenistic castle built to control the valley during the ancient ages. But later on it was reconstructed by the Byzantian Empire or the Cilician Armenia in the Medieval age. There are traces of three towers, a necropolis and a basilica as well as some houses.
