= Rhodian Peraia =

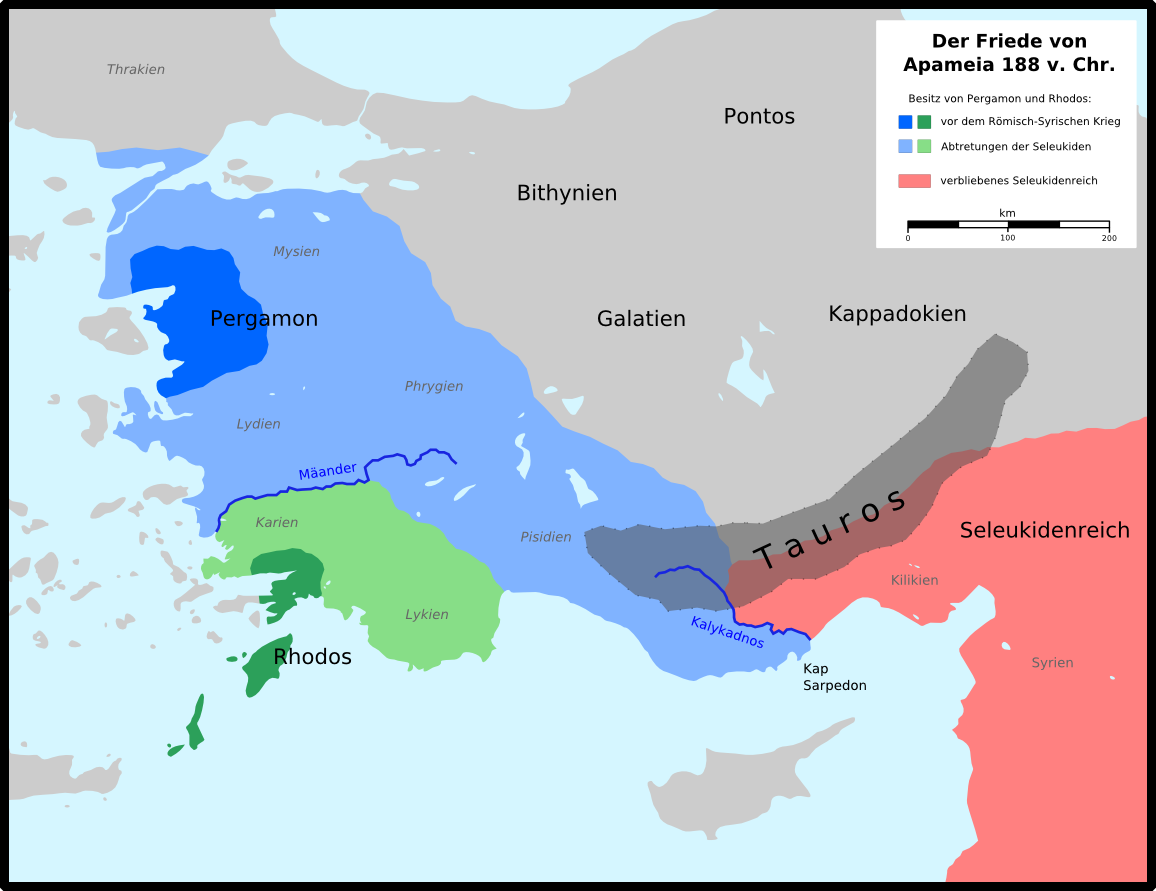
Map of Asia Minor after the Treaty of Apamea in 188 BC. Rhodian possessions are marked in green (darker shade for the pre-Treaty extent)

The Rhodian Peraea or Peraia (Ancient Greek: ἡ τῶν Ῥοδίων περαία, lit. 'peraia of the Rhodians') was the name for the southern coast of the region of Caria in western Asia Minor during the 5th–1st centuries BC, when the area was controlled and colonized by the nearby island of Rhodes.

Already in Classical times, before their synoecism and creation of the single Rhodian state in 408 BC, the three city-states of Rhodes, Lindos, Ialyssos, and Kameiros, separately possessed territory on the mainland of Asia Minor. This comprised the Cnidian Peninsula (but not Cnidus itself), as well as the nearby Trachea peninsula and its neighbouring region to the east. Like Rhodes, these territories were divided into demes, and their citizens were Rhodian citizens.

During the Hellenistic period, the extent of the Peraia grew with the addition of various vassal regions. It reached its greatest extent after the Treaty of Apamea in 188 BC, when the entirety of Caria and Lycia south of the Maeander River came under Rhodian rule, but this was short-lived; when Rhodes submitted to Rome in 167 BC, this region was lost again. During this time, the Peraia comprised the fully incorporated portion, lying between Cnidus and Kaunos, which as before was divided into demes and formed part of the Rhodian state, and the remainder of Caria and Lycia, which were tributary to Rhodes. Rhodes retained a portion of its old domains in Asia until 39 BC, when they were ceded to Stratonicea.

== Sources ==
- Blümel, Wolfgang (1991). Die Inschriften der Rhodischen Peraia (in German). Bonn: R. Habelt. ISBN 3-7749-2473-2.
- Bresson, Alain (1991). Recueil des inscriptions de la Pérée rhodienne: (Pérée intégrée) (in French). Paris: Université de Besançon. ISBN 2-251-60445-6.
- Fraser, Peter Marshall; Bean, George Ewart (1954). The Rhodian Peraea and islands. Oxford University Press.
- Held, Winfried (2009). "Die Karer und die Rhodische Peraia". Die Karer und die Anderen: internationales Kolloquium an der Freien Universität Berlin, 13. bis 15. Oktober 2005 (in German). Bonn: R. Habelt. pp. 121–134. ISBN 978-3-7749-3632-4.
- Rice, E. E. (1999). "Relations between Rhodes and the Rhodian Peraia". In Gabrielsen, V. (ed.). Hellenistic Rhodes. Politics, Culture, and Society. Aarhus: Aarhus University Press. pp. 45–54. ISBN 87-7288-676-5.

Ancient Caria

Oğuz-Kırca, E.D. 2015a. Two Models of Fortresses/ Fortress Settlements in the Carian Chersonesos (Karya Khersonesosu'nda (Pera) İki Tip Kale/ Kale Yerleşimi). TÜBA-AR 18: 125-143.

Oğuz-Kırca, E.D. 2015b. The Chora and The Core: A General Look at the Rural Settlement Pattern of (Pre)Hellenistic Bozburun Peninsula, Turkey. PAUSBED 20: 33-62.
