= Gulf of Gökova =

Coordinates: 36°59′57″N 28°09′43″E

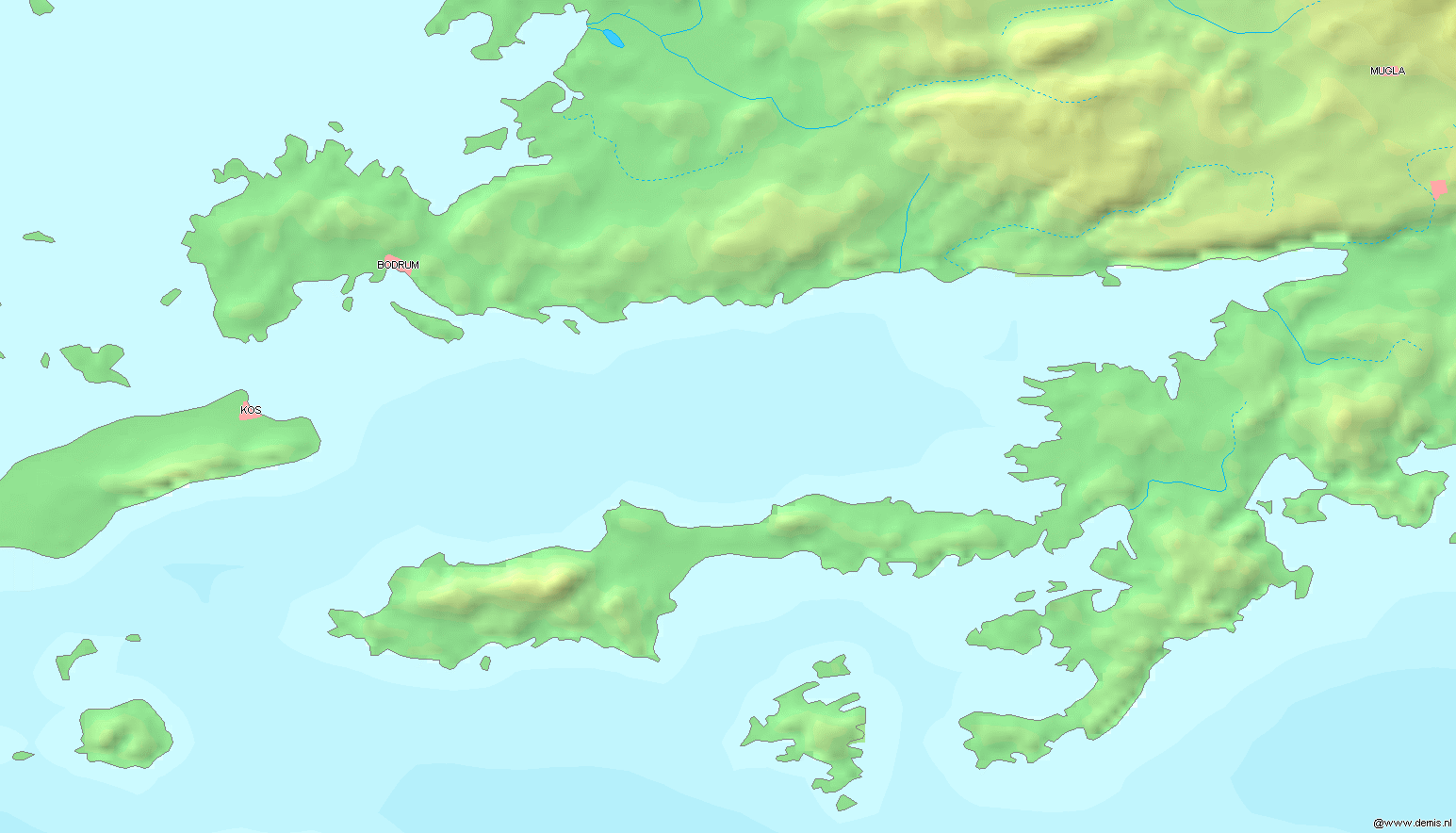
Gulf of Gökova

Gulf of Gökova (Turkish: Gökova Körfezi) or Gulf of Kerme (Turkish: Kerme Körfezi; Greek: Κεραμεικός κόλπος; Latin: Ceramicus Sinus, lit. 'ceramic gulf'; or Gulf of Cos), is a long (100 km), narrow gulf of the Aegean Sea between Bodrum and Datça peninsulas in south-west Turkey.

Administratively, the Gulf of Gökova coastline includes portions of the districts of, clockwise, Bodrum, Milas, Muğla, Ula, Marmaris and Datça. The Greek island of Kos lies along the entry into the Gulf.

Bodrum, located in its northwest reaches, is the only large city on the gulf today. In ancient times, alongside Halicarnassus (modern-day Bodrum), the city of Ceramus, located midway along the gulf's northern shore and after which the gulf was named, was also an important urban center. Across Ceramus (Gereme) (in the modern township of Ören), at a short distance from the gulf's southern shore and not far from its outlying waters, was another historical site of note, called Cedrae in ancient times. Cedrae was located in Sedir Island, which was prized by visitors for its beach and of which some remains still exist.

== Etymology ==
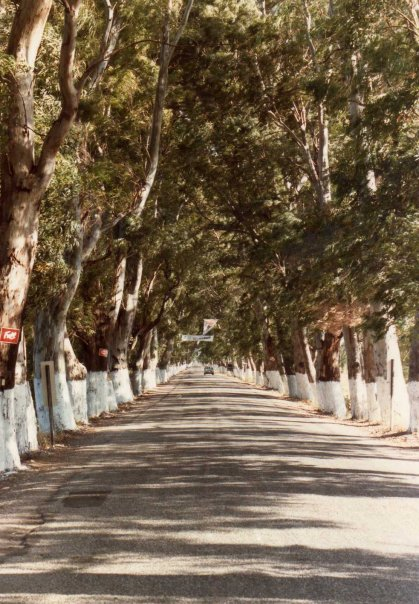
Old Muğla-Marmaris road in its section crossing the Plain of Gökova, homonymous with and located in the outlying waters of the Gulf of Gökova. Eucalyptus trees bordering the road were planted in 1936 to dry marshlands and help combat malaria.

The alluvial plain that extends to the Gulf's end, also named Gökova, is the location of the townships of Akyaka and Gökova, with only a few kilometers separating the two. Until 1945, the hamlets across the plain were mostly marshlands ridden with malaria until that time and were collectively known as Gökabad. Consequently, the gulf and one of the settlements came to be called Gökova, a term which is often used to designate the area in which Akyaka, and not the neighboring township of Gökova, is actually prominent.

The name, Gökova, (possibly derived from Cova, the designation by which the area was known in Ottoman times) is mentioned as "Djova" in some recent English navigation charts and alternatively is used for: the gulf, for the plain at the end of the same gulf, for a township situated in the same plain, and as a casual term covering the emerging resort area centered in the coastal town of Akyaka.

== See also ==
- Gökova
- Akyaka
- Ula
- Sedir Island
- Blue Cruise
