= Phryne Before the Areopagus =

Painting by Jean-Léon Gérôme

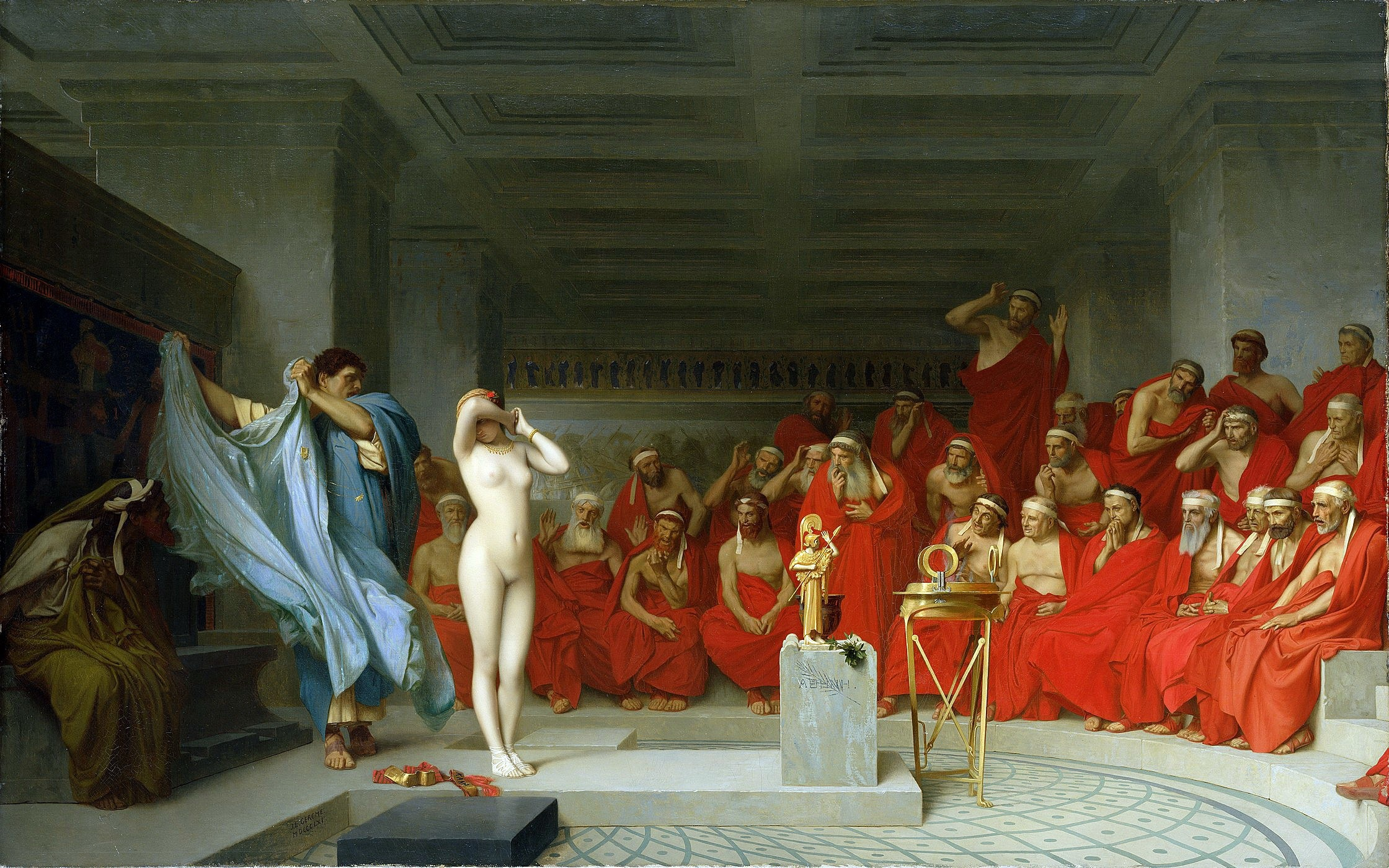
- Artist: Jean-Léon Gérôme
- Year: 1861
- Medium: Oil on canvas
- Dimensions: 80.5 cm × 128 cm (31.7 in × 50 in)
- Location: Kunsthalle Hamburg, Hamburg

Phryne Before the Areopagus (French: Phryne devant l'Areopage) is an 1861 painting by the French artist Jean-Léon Gérôme. The painting depicts the trial of Phryne, an ancient Greek hetaira (courtesan), who was charged with impiety. Phryne was said to have been acquitted after her defender Hypereides removed her robe and exposed her naked bosom, "to excite the pity of her judges by the sight of her beauty."

The painting was exhibited at the 1861 Salon. It is in the collection of the Kunsthalle Hamburg in Germany.

== Context ==
Phryne was an ancient Greek hetaira (courtesan), best known for her trial for impiety in which, according to legend, the jury was persuaded by the sight of her naked breasts to spare her. Though the title of Gérôme's painting sets Phryne's trial in the court of the Areopagus, the ancient sources discussing it do not. The comic playwright Posidippus, who described the trial in his play The Ephesian Woman, says that it took place in the Heliaia.

Phryne was a popular subject for eighteenth- and nineteenth-century French artists, who emphasised her status as a courtesan and usually depicted her nude. From the mid-eighteenth century, artists such as Jean-Baptiste-Henri Deshays had depicted the trial of Phryne, and following Jacques-Louis David's charcoal drawing on the theme in 1818, they had increasingly focused on depicting her nakedness before her judges. Gérôme's version was immediately influenced by works by Charles Gleyre, in whose studio Gérôme had previously worked, and Victor Mottez.

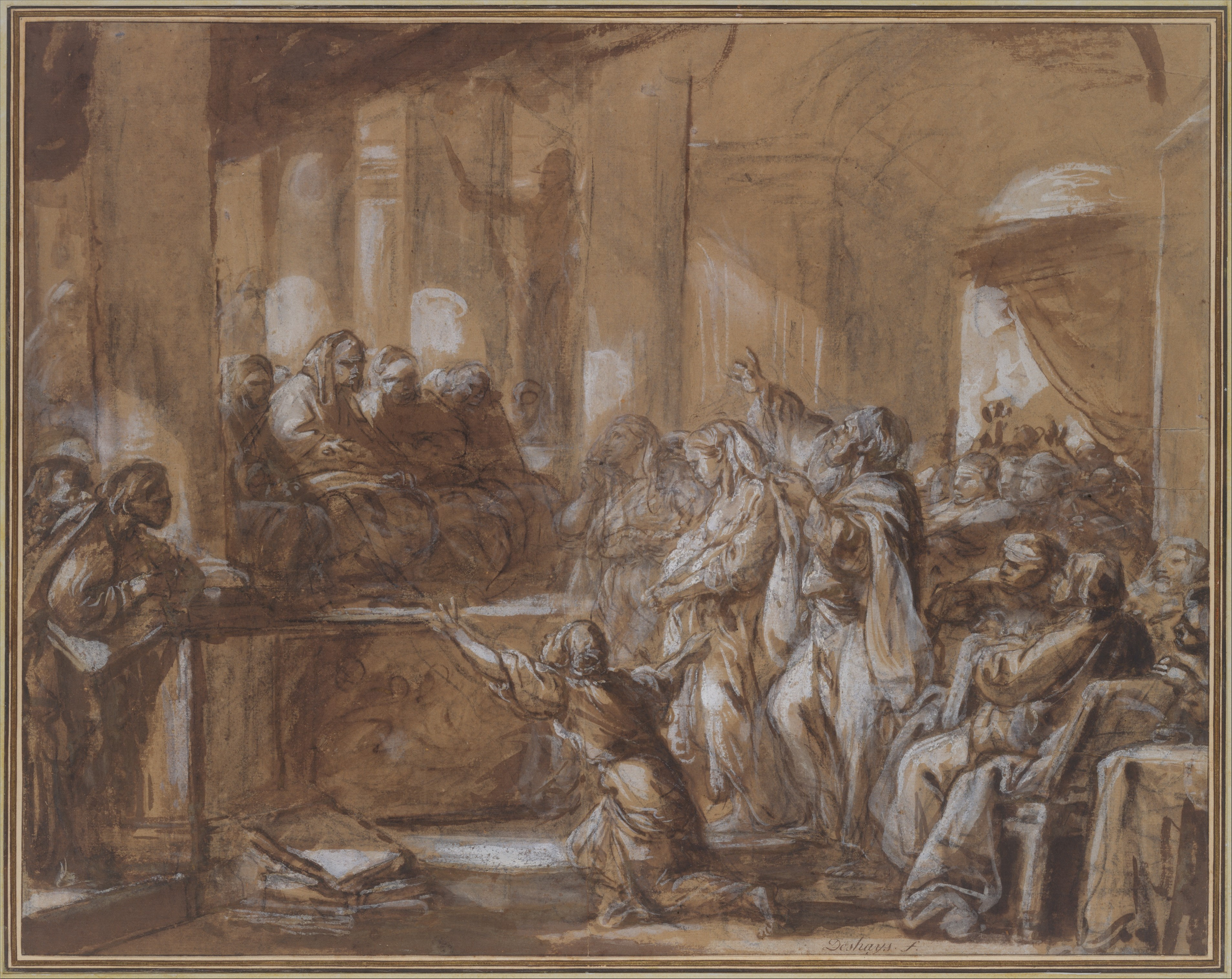
Jean-Baptiste-Henri Deshays, Phryne Before the Areopagus, mid-18th century

Jacques-Louis David, Phryne Before the Judges 1818

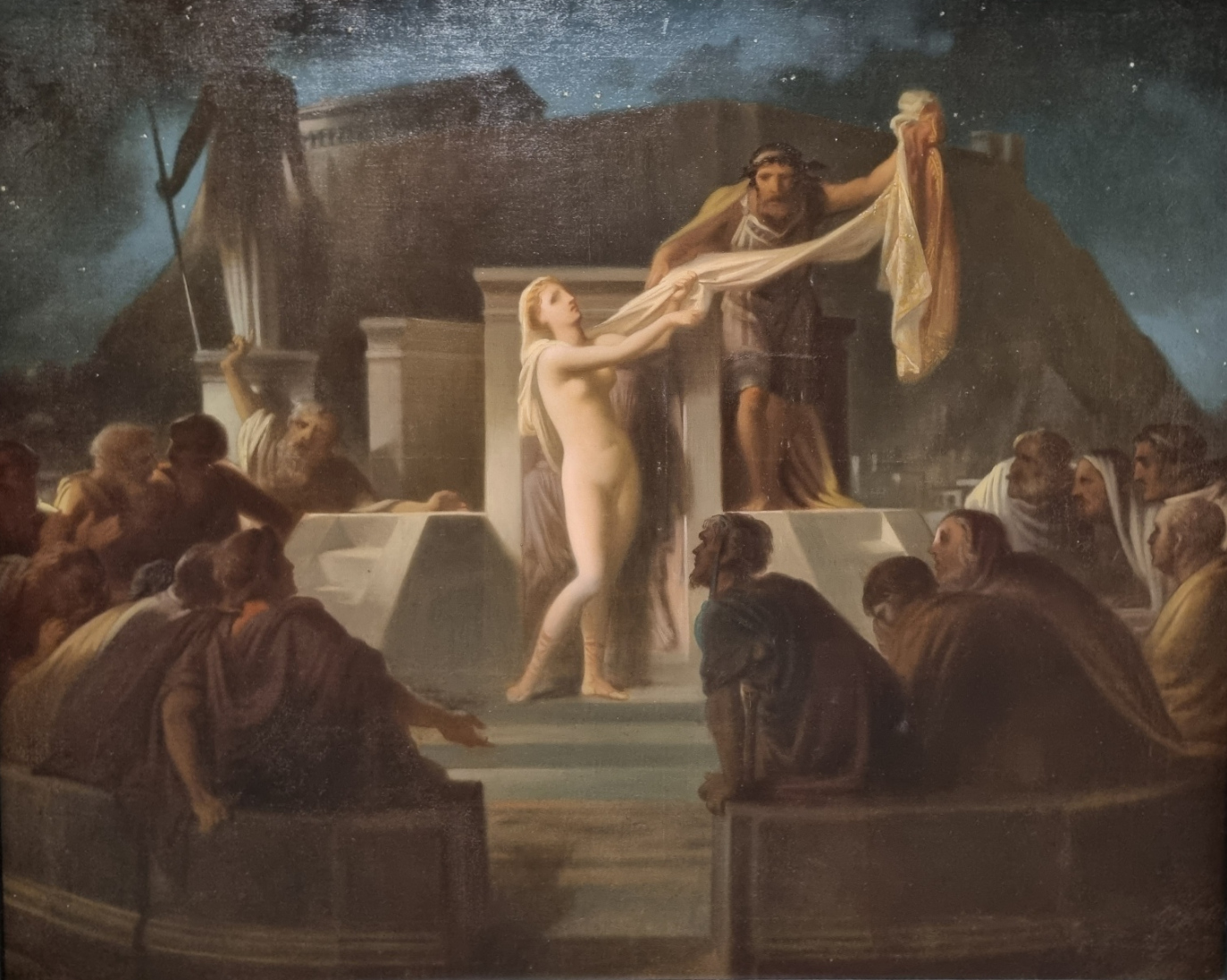
Victor Mottez, Phryne Before the Areopagus 1859

== Painting ==
Marie-Christine Leroux photographed by Nadar for Phryne Before the Areopagus

Phryne Before the Areopagus is an oil painting which measures 80 x 128 cm. It depicts Phryne standing nude, her hands covering her face. Hypereides, shown standing to the left of the painting, holds Phryne's robe; the jurors sit on the right hand side. In the center of the composition is a golden statue of the goddess Athena, with her name inscribed in Greek on its pedestal. It is one of several paintings by Gérôme – other examples including The Snake Charmer and Slave Market in Ancient Rome – which depicts an audience looking at a prurient spectacle.

Gérôme used Marie-Christine Leroux as a model for Phryne, commissioning Nadar to take photographs of her from which he could work. The work was exhibited at the 1861 Salon de Paris. In 1910 it was given to the Hamburger Kunsthalle, having previously been in the collection of John Henry William Schroder.

== Reception ==
Phyne Before the Areopagus was the most famous nineteenth-century depiction of Phryne. When it was exhibited at the Salon of 1861, Gérôme's painting was considered indecent and pornographic. It was controversial for showing her covering her face in shame, in the same pose that he used in several paintings of slaves in Eastern slave-markets. Driven by this controversy, Gérôme's painting was widely reproduced and caricatured, with engravings by Léopold Flameng, a sculpture by Alexandre Falguière, and a drawing by Paul Cézanne all modelled after Gérôme's Phryne. In the USA, Matt Morgan's production of tableaux vivants, "Matt Morgan's Living Statues", featured performers reproducing well-known contemporary nude paintings, including Phryne Before the Areopagus. By the end of the century, Gérôme's painting of Phryne and the various works inspired by it had made Phryne an "international cultural icon".

Bernhard Gillam made a famous caricature drawing in 1884 titled Phryne Before the Chicago Tribunal, where Phryne is replaced by the Republican Party presidential candidate James G. Blaine, covered in scandals, and Hypereides by the newspaper editor Whitelaw Reid. Teddy Roosevelt can be seen in the front row. Another caricature followed in 1908, The High Tariff Phryne Before the Tribunal.

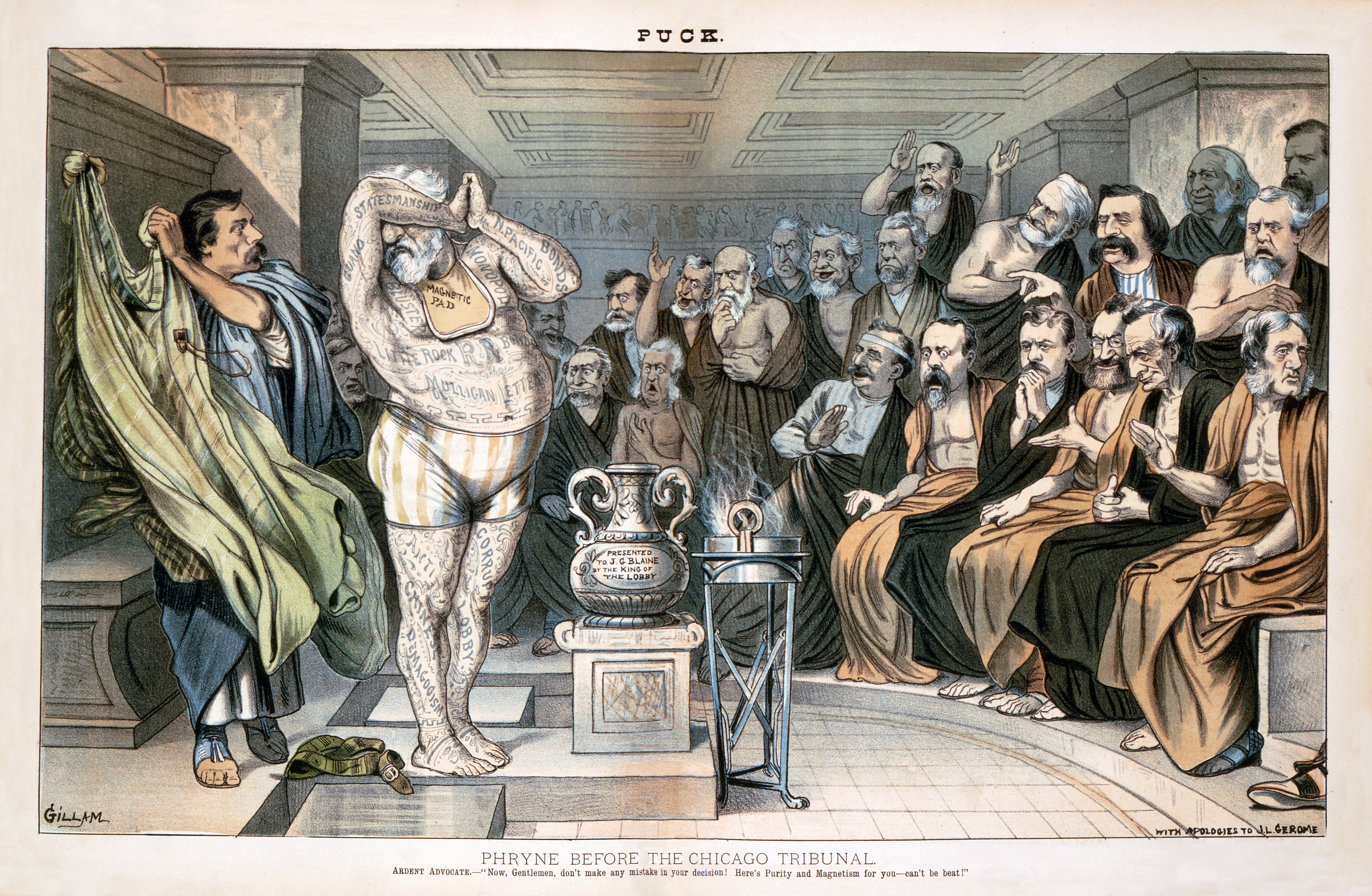
1884: Phryne before the Chicago Tribunal by Bernhard Gillam, Puck, v. 15, no. 378 (4 June 1884)

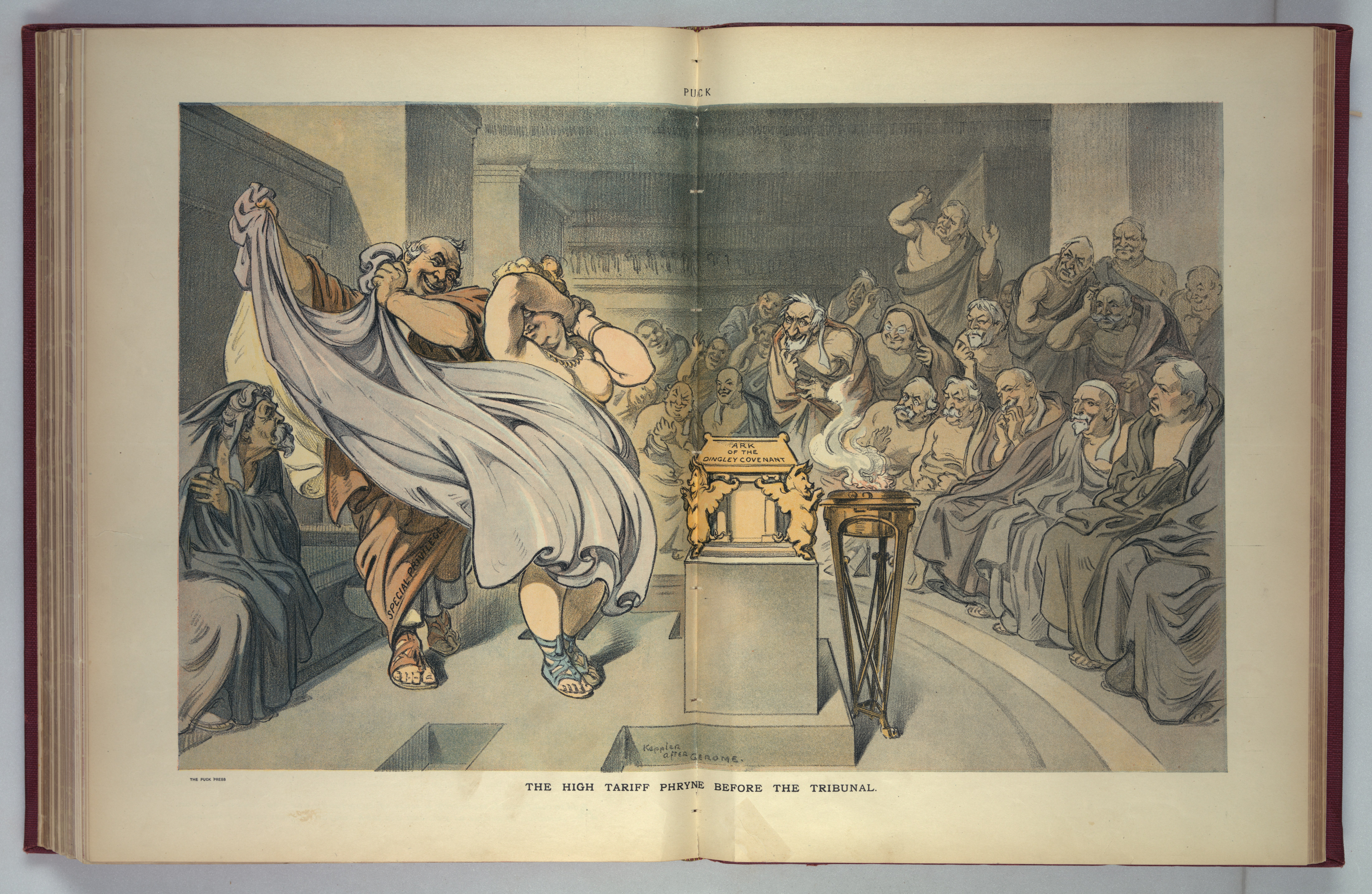
1908: The High Tariff Phryne Before the Tribunal by Udo J. Keppler, Puck, v. 64, no. 1658 (9 December 1908)
