= Phryne =

4th-century BC Greek courtesan

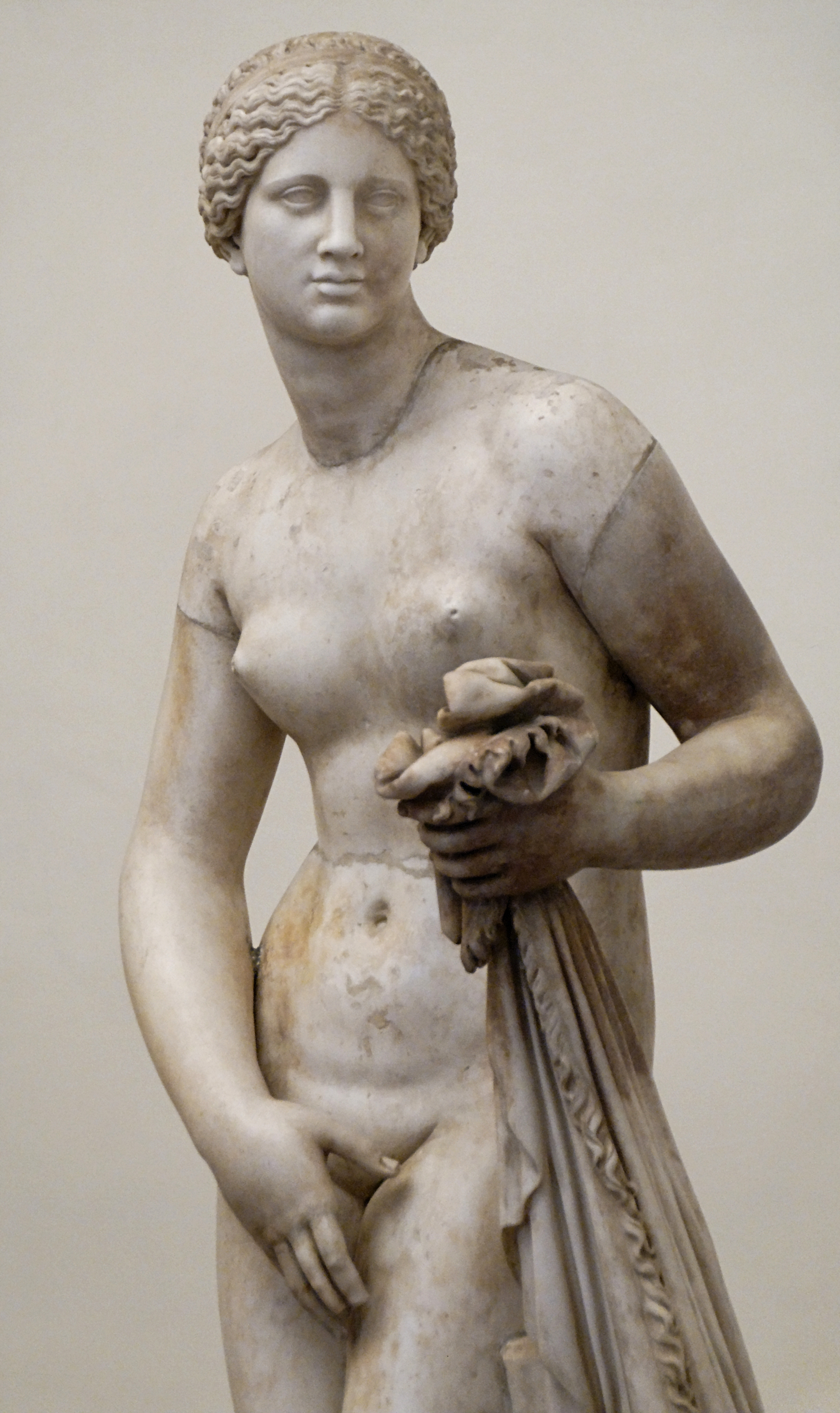
Roman marble copy of the Aphrodite of Knidos, for which Phryne is said to have been the model. The head and arms are restored. Museo Nazionale Romano.

Phryne (Ancient Greek: Φρύνη, (Note: /ˈfraɪni/; Ancient Greek pronunciation: ['pʰry.nɛː]) before 370 – after 316 BC) was an ancient Greek hetaira (courtesan). Born Mnesarete, she was from Thespiae in Boeotia, but seems to have lived most of her life in Athens. She apparently grew up poor, but became one of the richest women in Greece.

Little is known for certain about Phryne's life. She is best known for her trial for impiety, in which she was defended by the orator Hypereides. According to legend, she was acquitted after baring her breasts to the jury, though the historicity of this episode is doubtful. She also modelled for the artists Apelles and Praxiteles: the latter's Aphrodite of Knidos was said to have been based on her.

Phryne was largely ignored during the Renaissance, but artistic interest in her began to grow from the end of the eighteenth century. Her trial was depicted by Jean-Léon Gérôme in the 1861 painting Phryne Before the Areopagus, which influenced many subsequent depictions of her, and according to Laura McClure made her an "international cultural icon". As well as being depicted in the visual arts, since the nineteenth century she has also appeared in literature, in theatre, and on film.

== Sources ==
Scholarship about Phryne is hindered by the fragmentary nature of the surviving sources, many of which were not written until centuries after Phryne's own time. As with other women from classical Athens, this is more challenging as surviving sources were written entirely by men, and reflect male viewpoints and biases. The most substantial contemporary source about Phryne's life was Hypereides' defence speech from her trial, which took place perhaps between 350 and 340 BC. In the ancient world this was a major influence on Phryne's biographical tradition, but it is now lost, except for a few fragments. The surviving ancient sources about Phryne are mostly from the Roman Empire, based on earlier Greek literature. The most important of these is the second-century AD rhetorician and grammarian Athenaeus, from Naucratis in Roman Egypt. His Deipnosophistae ("The Scholars at Dinner") is the source of the vast majority of extant ancient writings about Phryne. Other authors of the first, second and third centuries AD, including Plutarch, Pausanias, and Diogenes Laertius, also tell anecdotes about Phryne.

Athenaeus' main source was fourth-century comic drama. By the mid-fourth century BC, Athenian comic playwrights had moved away from the mythological subjects popular in earlier periods, and more often satirised real people. From the late fifth century, hetairai were a frequent subject of comedy, and comic plays from Phryne's lifetime often refer to hetairai and their connections to well-known men. Phryne featured in several of these plays, including Timocles' Orestautokleides and Neaira, Anaxilas' Neottis, and Posidippus' The Ephesian Woman. In Neottis and Orestautokleides she is named in lists of hetairai, in Neaira Timocles' makes a joke about her early life, and Posidippus describes her trial in The Ephesian Woman. Two other plays, Antiphanes' The Birth of Aphrodite and Alexis' The Woman from Knidos, might have alluded to her association with the artists Apelles and Praxiteles.

== Life ==
Very little is known about Phryne's life for certain. Ancient sources about her largely tell disjointed anecdotes which are difficult to piece together into a full biography, and many of those stories may be invented. Helen Morales writes that separating fact from fiction in accounts of Phryne's life is impossible.

Phryne was from Thespiae in Boeotia. She was probably born in the 370s BC, (Note: Scholars have suggested birthdates for Phryne from the late 380s BC to circa 370. She was likely born before the conquest and subsequent destruction of Thespiae by Thebes in the late 370s.) and was the daughter of Epicles. Both Plutarch and Athenaeus say that her real name was Mnesarete. According to Plutarch, she was called Phryne because she had a pale complexion like a toad (phryne in Greek). Eleonora Cavallini suggests that this apparently unflattering name was applied ironically, contrasting the ugliness of a toad with Phryne's beauty. She may also have been nicknamed Saperdion, Clausigelos, and Sestus. (Note: According to Athenaeus, there were two Phrynes: one was nicknamed Saperdion ("little fish"); the other Clausigelos ("teary laughter"). One of these bore the nickname Sestus ("fleecer"). He is not consistent in differentiating the two, and it is likely that there was in fact only one Phryne who was wrongly thought to be two people by later scholars.)

Phryne seems to have spent most of her life as a hetaira in Athens. Often translated as "courtesan", a hetaira was a kind of sex worker in classical Athens. They are often distinguished on the one hand from the porne, a slave-prostitute who worked in a brothel, and on the other from the pallake, a concubine who had a long-term, exclusive relationship with one particular man. The precise distinction between these terms is debated by scholars, and ancient sources do not necessarily make strict distinctions, rather choosing one term or another based on their rhetorical purposes.

Phryne might have come to Athens with her family following the conquest of Thespiae by Thebes in 373 BC, been born in Athens to Thespian refugees following the Theban conquest, or been brought there as a girl to take part in the sex trade, as was Neaira, another fourth-century hetaira. She apparently grew up poor – comic playwrights portray her picking capers (Note: Capers had so little value that only the very poor would gather them.) – and became one of the wealthiest women in the Greek world. According to Callistratus, after Alexander razed Thebes in 335, Phryne offered to pay to rebuild the walls on the condition that they carry an inscription acknowledging her. She was also said to have dedicated a statue of herself at Delphi, and a statue of Eros at Thespiae. Phryne probably lived beyond 316 BC, when Thebes was rebuilt; according to Plutarch, her fame meant that she could continue to charge high fees to her clients in her old age.

When a lover who was a miser tried to flatter her by saying, "You're Praxiteles' little Aphrodite!", she responded: "And you're Pheidias' Eros!" (Note: Here Phryne's retort is a pun on the name Pheidias and the Greek word pheidomai, meaning "I am thrifty".)
— Athenaeus, Deipnosophistae 13.49 = 13.585f, trans. S. Douglas Olson

Hetairai had a reputation in ancient literature for their wit and learning. The trope of the witty hetaira derives from the Memoirs of Lynceus of Samos, a comic author of the late fourth century BC, which contained several anecdotes about the wit of the hetaira Gnathaina. Several anecdotes from the Deipnosophistae relate Phryne's witticisms. Many of these portray Phryne getting the better of a client – in one story, she asked a prospective client for one mina (100 drachmae – by comparison an unskilled labourer in ancient Athens might earn half a drachma per day) to sleep with her. When he complained that she had charged a different man less than half of this amount, she retorted that if he waited until she wanted sex, she would accept the lower fee.

Though ancient authors writing about Phryne were deeply concerned with her beauty, they rarely described specifics of her appearance. The only physical description of her in ancient sources is from Plutarch, who mentions her pale complexion. Other sources contrast the naturalness of her beauty with the artificiality of that of other courtesans. In one anecdote, during a dinner party game, Phryne had all the women present wipe their faces. When their makeup was removed Phryne was revealed to be the only one who is naturally beautiful rather than relying on cosmetics. Another story connected to Phryne's beauty concerns her inability to seduce the philosopher Xenocrates, emphasising his self-restraint.

=== Trial ===
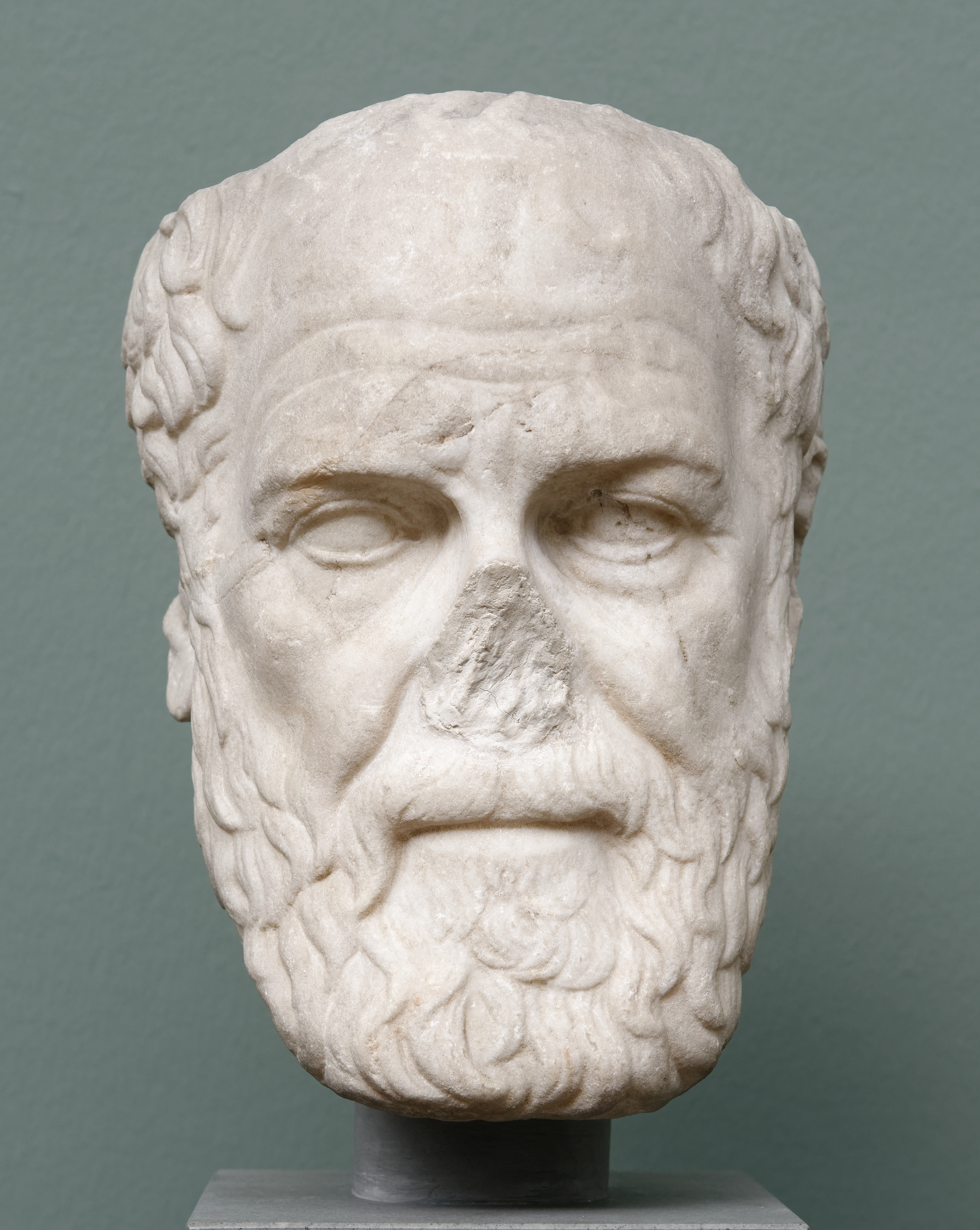
Portrait head often identified as Hypereides. Copy of a late-4th or early 3rd-century BC Greek original.

The most famous event in Phryne's life was the prosecution brought against her by Euthias. Little is known of Euthias, except that he was supposedly a former lover of Phryne, and was accused of being a sycophant – a person who habitually brought prosecutions for personal gain. The prosecution speech delivered by Euthias – which, according to Athenaeus, was composed by Anaximenes of Lampsacus on his behalf – did not survive. Phryne was defended by Hypereides, a well-known and wealthy orator who had a reputation for licentiousness due to his association with hetairai. Six of the speeches attributed to him relate to hetairai, and in a surviving fragment of his defense of Phryne, he admits to being her lover. Hypereides's defence speech survives only in fragments, though it was greatly admired in antiquity. The date of the trial is uncertain. Based on Athenaeus' claim that Anaximenes wrote the speech for the prosecution, it has been suggested that it was probably between 350 and 340 BC. (Note: If Anaximenes wrote the speech, he must have done so before he moved to Macedon; the date of this is uncertain but he seems to have been connected to the Macedonian court by the late 340s.) Alternatively, Craig Cooper argues that the trial was likely after the Battle of Chaeronea in 338 BC, while Eleanora Cavallini suggests that it was after 335 BC.

Phryne was charged with asebeia, a kind of blasphemy. An anonymous treatise on rhetoric, which summarises the case against Phryne, lists three specific accusations against her – that she held a "shameless komos" or ritual procession, that she introduced a new god, and that she organised unlawful thiasoi or debauched meetings. The charge of introducing new gods had previously been used in the trial of Socrates in 399 BC; that of organising thiasoi is also known from the trial of Ninos, possibly about 360 BC. According to Harpocration, the new god introduced by Phryne was called Isodaites; though Harpocration describes him as being "foreign", the name is Greek and other sources consider it an epithet of Dionysus, Helios, or Pluto. It is unclear what precisely was supposed to have been the issue with Phryne's komos and thiasoi: perhaps that they were attended by both men and women, or by lower-class women. (Note: The sources are inconsistent on whether Phryne's thiasoi were mixed-sex events; the rhetorical treatise which summarises Eustathius' case against Phryne describes them as "for both men and women" whereas Harpocration mentions only women.)

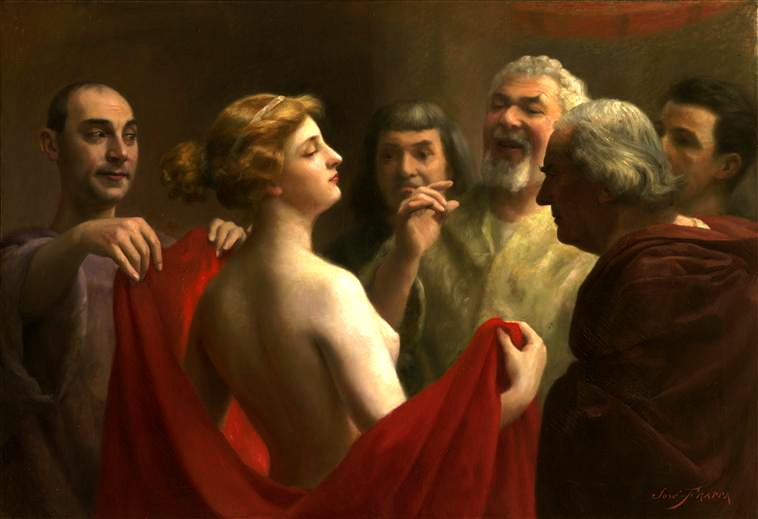
Phryne, by José Frappa, before 1903

According to Athenaeus, Euthias's case against Phryne was motivated by a personal quarrel rather than Phryne's alleged impiety. Craig Cooper suggests that the trial of Phryne was politically motivated. He observes that Aristogeiton, to whom Athenaeus attributes a speech against Phryne, was a political enemy of Hypereides and prosecuted him for illegally introducing a decree after the Battle of Chaeronea. Phryne's own provocative behaviour – for instance her offer to restore the walls of Thebes, on the condition that an inscription attributing the rebuilding to "Phryne the hetaira" be displayed – may also have partially motivated the prosecution. Konstantinos Kapparis suggests that the trial might have been seen as a response to "the uppity alien woman who did not know her place". Cavallini argues that Phryne's offer to rebuild the walls of Thebes, and her dedication of a portrait statue at Delphi which was placed next to one of king Philip II of Macedon, publicly aligned Phryne with the anti-Macedonian faction with which Hypereides was associated, perhaps motivating the case against her.

Phryne was said to have been acquitted after the jury saw her bare breasts – Quintilian says that she was saved "not by Hypereides' pleading, but by the sight of her body". Three different versions of this story survive. In Quintilian's account, along with those of Sextus Empiricus and Philodemus, (Note: Philodemus, the earliest of these sources, lived in the first century BC, Quintilian in the first century AD, and Sextus Empiricus in the second century AD) Phryne makes the decision to expose her own breasts; while in Athenaeus's version Hypereides exposes Phryne as the climax of his speech, and in Plutarch's version Hypereides exposes her because he saw that his speech had failed to persuade the jury. In ancient Greece baring the breasts was a gesture intended to arouse compassion, and Phryne's supposed behaviour in the court has parallels in Greek myth and literature. Havelock compares it to Hecuba pleading with her son Hector in the Iliad, showing her breasts to remind him of her place as his mother. Ioannis Ziogas observes that it particularly recalls Clytemnestra's plea to Orestes in Aeschylus's play The Libation Bearers – which like Hecuba's appeal to Hector reminds Orestes of her position as his mother – and the story of Helen appealing to her husband Menelaus for mercy after the fall of Troy – where it is the eroticism of Helen's display which saves her. Both Ziogas and Melissa Funke argue that the story of Phryne bearing her breasts to the jury specifically referenced that of Helen; just as Helen's divine beauty protects her from punishment for her actions in the mortal world, so too does Phryne's.

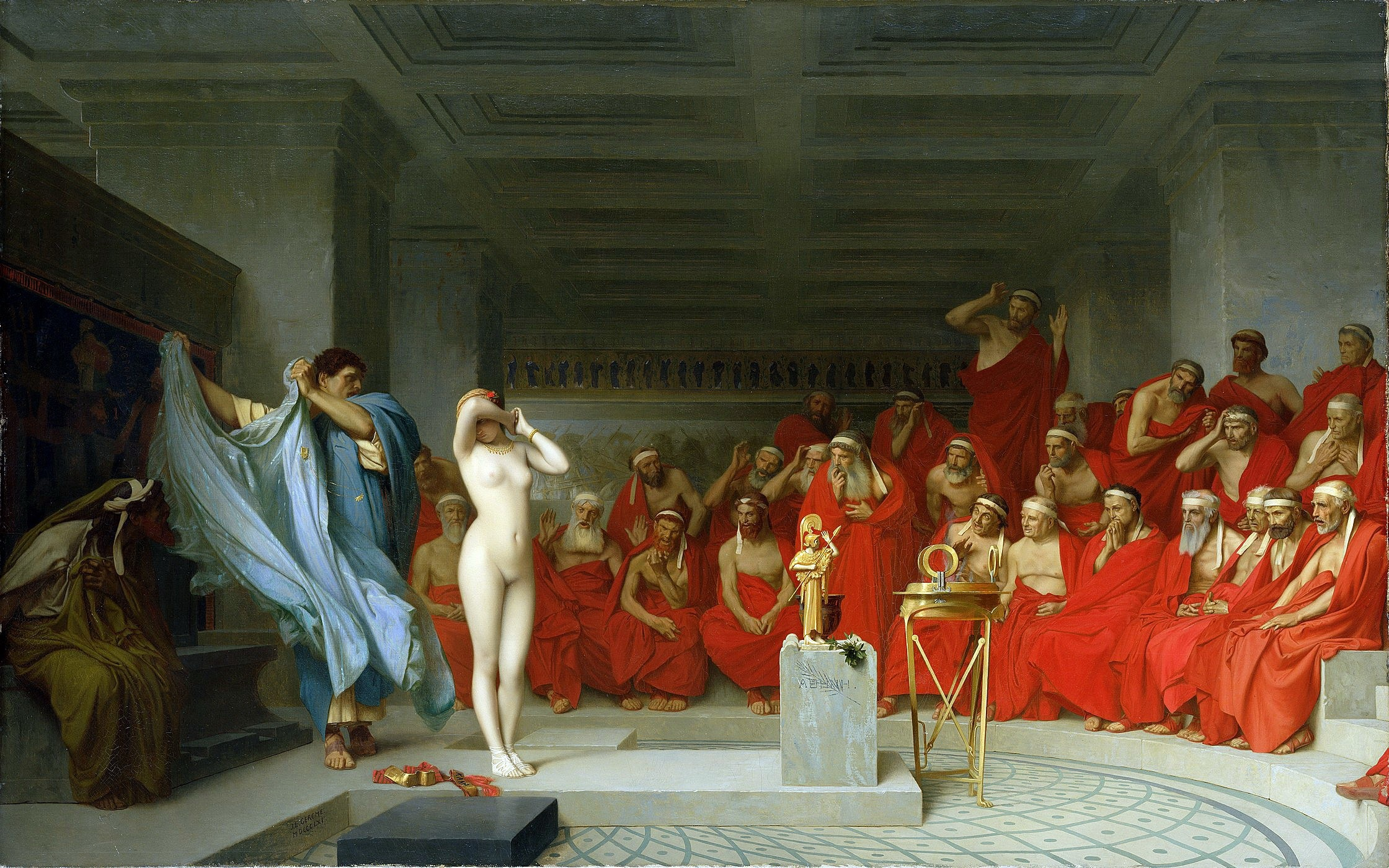
Phryne Before the Areopagus by Jean-Léon Gérôme, c. 1861

However, this episode probably never happened. It was not mentioned in Posidippus's version of the trial in his comedy The Ephesian Woman, quoted by Athenaeus. The Ephesian Woman was produced c. 290 BC, and the story of Phryne baring her breasts therefore probably postdates this. In Posidippus's version, Phryne personally pleaded with each of the jurors at her trial for them to save her life, and it was this which secured her acquittal. The story of Phryne baring her breasts may have been invented by the Hellenistic biographer Idomeneus of Lampsacus, (Note: c. 350–270 BC) who wrote a treatise on Athenian demagogues. Though all of the ancient accounts assume that Phryne was on trial for her life, asebeia was not necessarily punished by death; it was an agōn timētos, in which the jury would decide on the punishment if the accused was convicted. (Note: The apparent contradiction between the assumption that Phryne was on trial for her life and the fact that the punishment for asebeia was not fixed has caused David Phillips to suggest that she was in fact tried under a different procedure, called eisangelia.)

Phryne's trial is, along with those of Ninos and Theoris of Lemnos, one of three known from the fourth century in which a metic (a free, non-Athenian resident of Athens) woman was accused of a religious crime. Hers was the only one in which the accused was acquitted – Rebecca Futo Kennedy argues that this was due to Phryne's greater wealth and connections to influential men. A Hellenistic biographer, Hermippus of Smyrna, reports that after Phryne's acquittal, Euthias was so furious that he never spoke publicly again. Kapparis suggests that in fact he was disenfranchised, possibly because he failed to gain one fifth of the jurors' votes and was unable to pay the subsequent fine. The trial of Phryne also supposedly led to two new laws being passed governing courtroom behaviour: one forbade the accused being present while the jury considered their verdict; the other forbade lament in the courtroom.

=== Model ===
Bending his proud neck below my sandals,
Praxiteles molded me with captive hands.
For creating me in bronze,
his very love stashed within,
he gave me to Phryne as a present of love;
And she brought it in turn to Love,
For it is right that lovers bring the gift of Love itself to Love.

— Julianus, Greek Anthology 16.203, trans. Melissa Funke

In ancient literature, hetairai were often said to have modelled for famous artists: for instance Aristides of Thebes was said to have painted Leontion. Phryne was particularly associated with the sculptor Praxiteles, and was reputedly the model for both him and the painter Apelles.

Phryne is most famously associated with Praxiteles' Aphrodite of Knidos. Produced in the mid-fourth century, this was the first three-dimensional and monumentally sized female nude in ancient Greek art. However, the historicity of this association is doubtful. The only source for the connection is Athenaeus. The sixth-century rhetorician Choricius of Gaza also says that Praxiteles used her as a model for a statue of Aphrodite, though according to him it was one commissioned by the Spartans. It is not mentioned by other ancient authors who discuss both Phryne and the Aphrodite of Knidos, such as the first-century AD Roman author Pliny the Elder; nor is the association mentioned in Pseudo-Lucian's extensive description of the Aphrodite of Knidos, (Note: The identity and dates of Pseudo-Lucian are uncertain) or the eleven surviving ancient epigrams about the sculpture. In the second century, the theologian and philosopher Clement of Alexandria named the model not as Phryne but Cratina.

Praxiteles also produced a golden or gilt statue of Phryne which was displayed – according to Pausanias dedicated by Phryne; according to Athenaeus by the Thespians – in the sanctuary of Apollo at Delphi. This may have been the first female portrait ever dedicated at Delphi; it is the only known statue of a woman alone to be dedicated before the Roman period. One of Praxiteles' sculptures of Eros, the god of sexual desire, was said to have been inspired by his desire for Phryne, and he later gifted it to her. In the version of the story told by Pausanias, Phryne tricked Praxiteles by pretending that his studio was on fire; when he mourned the loss of the statue of Eros she knew that he believed it to be his most beautiful work and thus requested that he gift it to her. Phryne later had the statue installed in Thespiae alongside two other sculptures by Praxiteles, one of Aphrodite and one of Phryne herself. According to Pliny, Phryne was also the model for Praxiteles' sculpture of a smiling courtesan, which may have originally been displayed in Athens.

Like Praxiteles, Apelles used Phryne as a model for Aphrodite. According to Athenaeus, he was inspired by the sight of Phryne walking naked into the sea at Eleusis to use her as a model for his painting of Aphrodite Anadyomene (Aphrodite rising from the sea). (Note: Alternatively, Pliny reports that Alexander the Great's mistress Campaspe was the model for Apelles' Aphrodite.) This was displayed at the sanctuary of Asclepius on the Greek island of Kos before being taken to Rome by the emperor Augustus (r. 27 BC – 14 AD); by the first century AD it appears to have been one of Apelles' best-known works.

== Reception ==
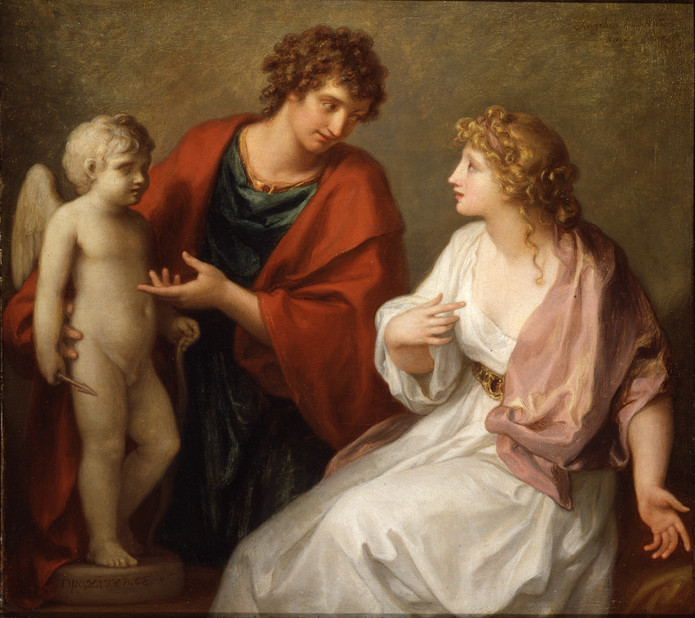
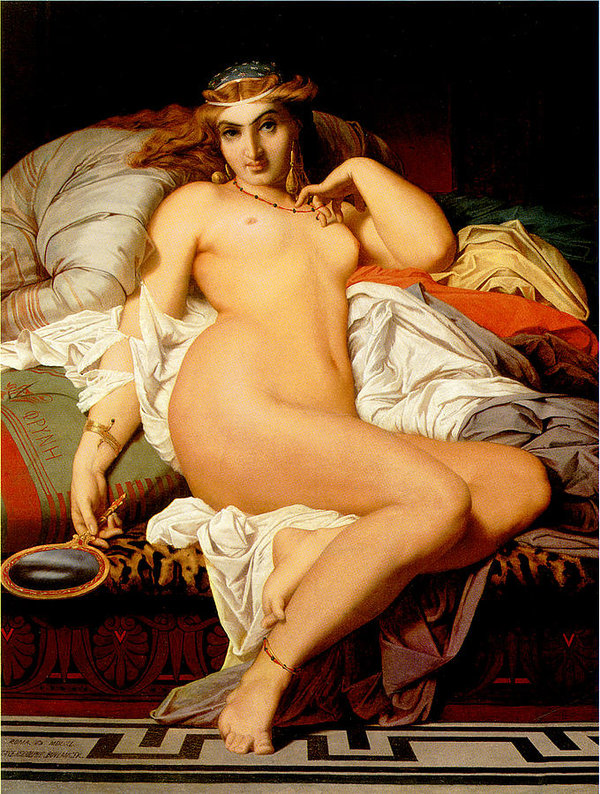
Depictions of Phryne in the late-eighteenth and early-nineteenth century, such as Angelica Kauffmann's Praxiteles Giving Phryne his Statue of Cupid (Note: Cupid is the Roman counterpart of the Greek god Eros) (1794) avoid eroticising Phryne; paintings of the latter half of the nineteenth century such as Gustave Boulanger's Phryne (1850) eroticise and exoticise her.

Hypereides's defence speech was translated into Latin by the orator Marcus Valerius Messalla Corvinus, active in the late 1st century BC. The translation was praised in an oratorical handbook written by Quintilian in the 1st century AD for conveying what Quintilian calls the subtilitas of the original. (Note: Nisbet & Rudd 2004, pp. 246–247. Quintilian discusses the translation at Institutio oratoria 10.5.2.) (Note: When applied to rhetoric, the term subtilitas typically denoted plainness, simplicity, and the lack of oratorical flourishes.) Albert Schachter suggests that the original Greek text may have been kept in Phryne's native Thespiae, and that Corvinus possibly travelled there to consult it.

Phryne was largely ignored during the Renaissance in favour of women such as Lucretia and Cleopatra, who were seen as heroic. Only three paintings of Phryne are known from the seventeenth century, but interest in depicting her increased in the eighteenth century with the advent of Neoclassicism. Early depictions of her by Angelica Kauffmann and J. M. W. Turner avoid eroticising her. From the eighteenth century French artists focused on portraying Phryne as a courtesan, particularly depicting her public nudity at religious festivals or during her trial. This came as part of a broader interest in historical courtesans in eighteenth- and nineteenth-century French art and literature. By the mid-nineteenth century artists such as Gustave Boulanger, rejecting the neoclassical aesthetic of Hellenism, painted Phryne without any reference to the ancient context as an eroticised and Orientalised nude.

The most famous nineteenth-century depiction of Phryne was Jean-Léon Gérôme's Phryne Before the Areopagus. Gérôme's painting depicts Phryne standing naked in the courtroom, (Note: Though the title of Gérôme's painting sets Phryne's trial in the Areopagus, this is not supported by the ancient sources; Posiddipus says that the court was the Heliaia.) covering her face with both arms and leaving her body exposed. This painting was controversial for showing Phryne covering her face in shame, in the same pose that Gérôme used in several paintings of slaves in Eastern slave-markets. Critics argued that Phryne should be proud rather than ashamed of her beauty, and that Gérôme's portrayal of Phryne was anachronistic. Others complained that Gérôme's Phryne was too like an ordinary woman, lacking in the ideal Aphrodite-like beauty they expected, or that the apparently prurient reactions of the judges was inappropriate, and that they should have been portrayed as having religious admiration, rather than desire, for Phryne's beauty. Driven by this controversy, Gérôme's painting was widely reproduced and caricatured, with engravings by Léopold Flameng, a sculpture by Alexandre Falguière, and a drawing by Paul Cézanne all modelled after Gérôme's Phryne. The painting was widely enough known that in 1884, Bernhard Gillam could parody it in a political cartoon for the American magazine Puck. By the end of the century, Gérôme's painting of Phryne and the various works inspired by it had made her an "international cultural icon", in the words of Laura McClure.

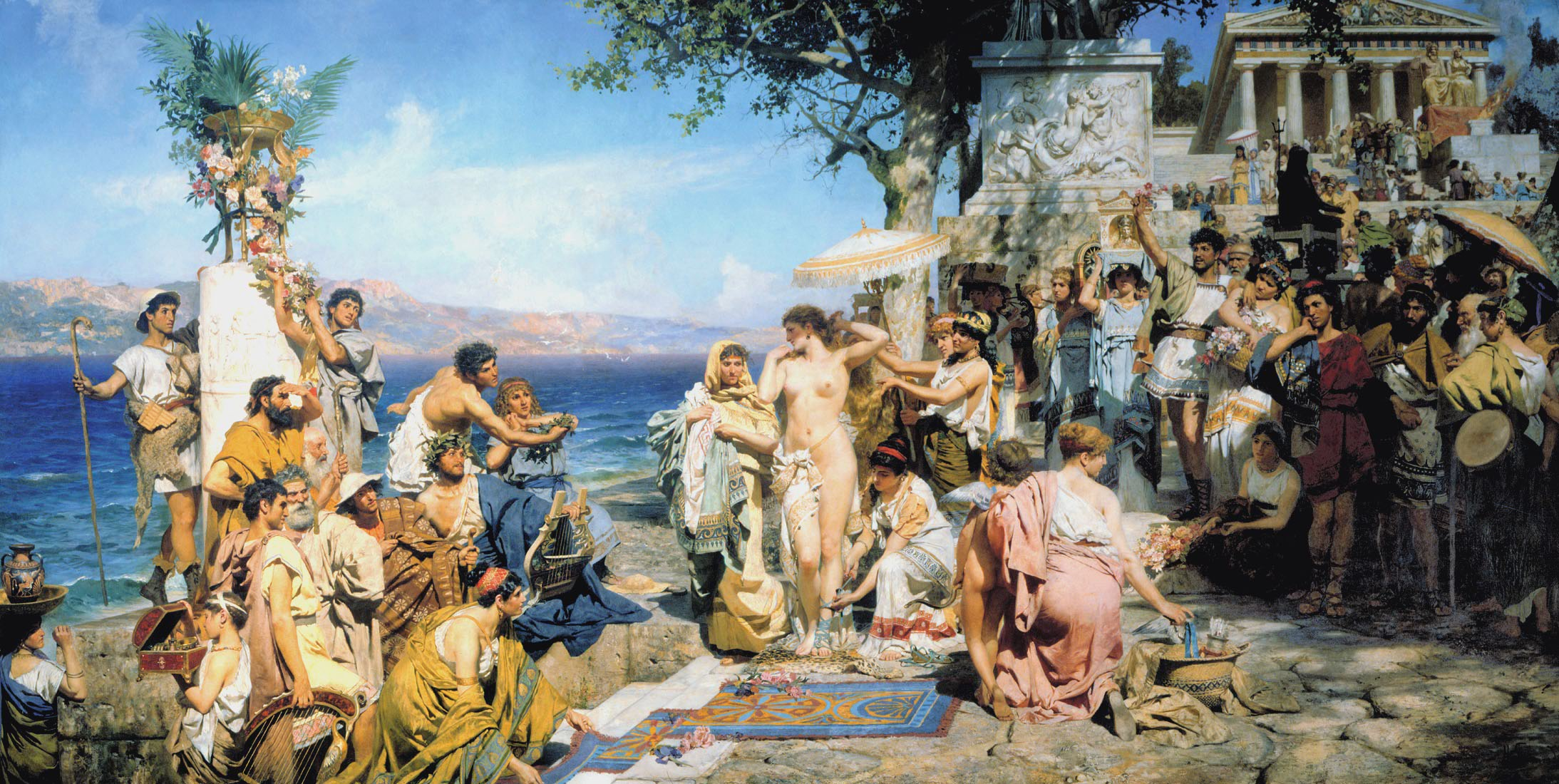
Henryk Siemiradzki, Phryne at the Poseidonia in Eleusis, 1889

The story of Phryne bathing at Eleusis, which according to Athenaeus inspired Apelles to paint the Aphrodite Anadyomene, was also a subject for nineteenth-century painters. In Britain, Frederic Leighton and Edward Burne-Jones both painted works on this theme in the 1880s, but the most famous nineteenth-century painting of the subject was Henryk Siemiradzki's enormous – nearly eight metres wide – painting Phryne at the Poseidonia in Eleusis.

In literature, the eighteenth-century poet Alexander Pope took Phryne's name for two women: George I's mistress the Duchess of Kendal in his poem "Phryne", and Robert Walpole's mistress (and later wife) Maria Skerret in the Epistle to Bathurst. Phryne appears in Charles Baudelaire's poem "Lesbos", from Les Fleurs du mal, where she is used metonymically to represent courtesans in general. In the early twentieth century, the German poet Rainer Maria Rilke alluded to Baudelaire's "Lesbos" in his poem "Die Flamingos", echoing the reference to Phryne. Rilke compares the flamingos to Phryne, as they seduce themselves – by folding their wings over their own heads – more effectively than even she could ("they seem to think / themselves seductive; that their charms surpass / a Phryne's"). Late nineteenth-century depictions of Phryne in other media included a waltz by Antonin d'Argenton, a shadow-theatre production by Maurice Donnay – where the scene of Phryne's trial was modelled on Gérôme's painting – and a comic opera by Camille Saint-Saëns.

In the twentieth century, Phryne made the transition to cinema. In 1952 Alessandro Blasetti's "Il processo di Frine" ("The Trial of Phryne") adapted the story of Phryne's trial with a contemporary setting, based on a short story by Edoardo Scarfoglio. The following year, the peplum film Frine, cortigiana d'Oriente ("Phryne, the Oriental Courtesan") was released. In both films, the depiction of the trial is iconographically influenced by Gérôme's painting – in Il processo di Frine, her lawyer covers her with his own cloak before removing it in the manner of Gérôme's Hypereides; in Frine, cortigiana d'Oriente Phryne undresses entirely, though to avoid censorship only her naked back is shown on screen. A third Italian film, La Venere di Cheronea ("The Venus of Chaeronea"), focused on the story of the relationship between Phryne and Praxiteles.

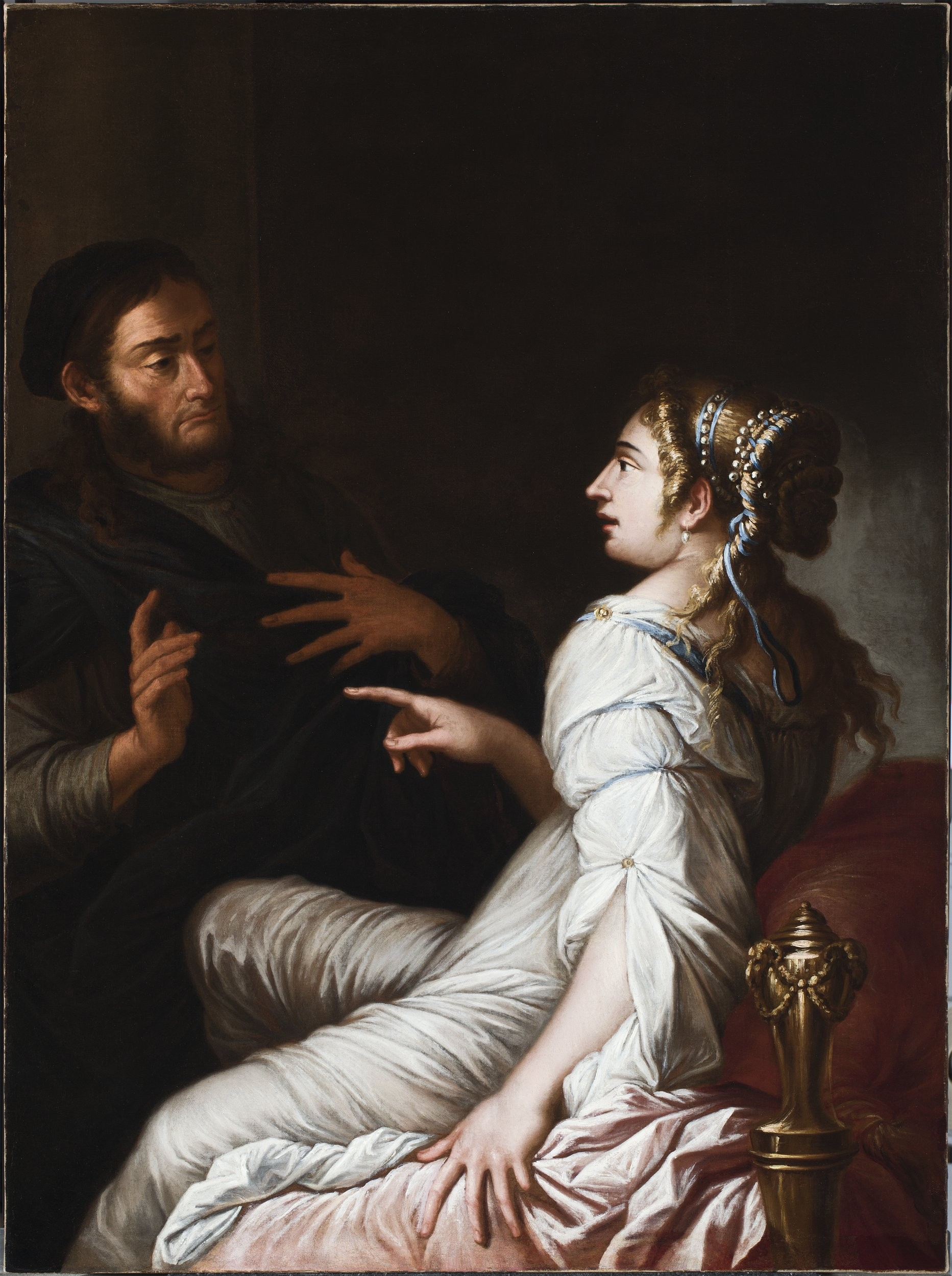
Salvator Rosa, Phryne and Xenocrates 1662

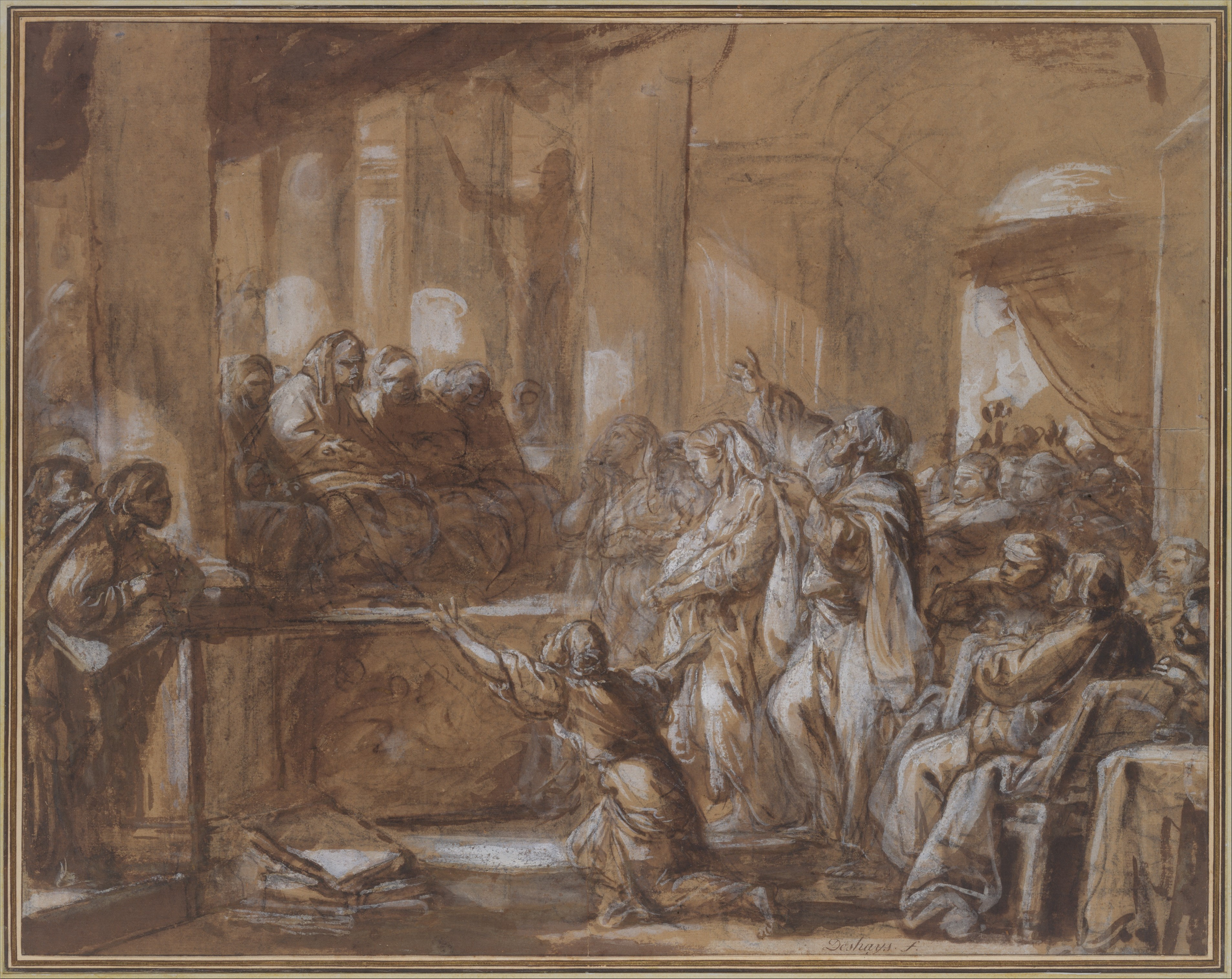
Jean-Baptiste-Henri Deshays, Phryne Before the Areopagus mid-18th century

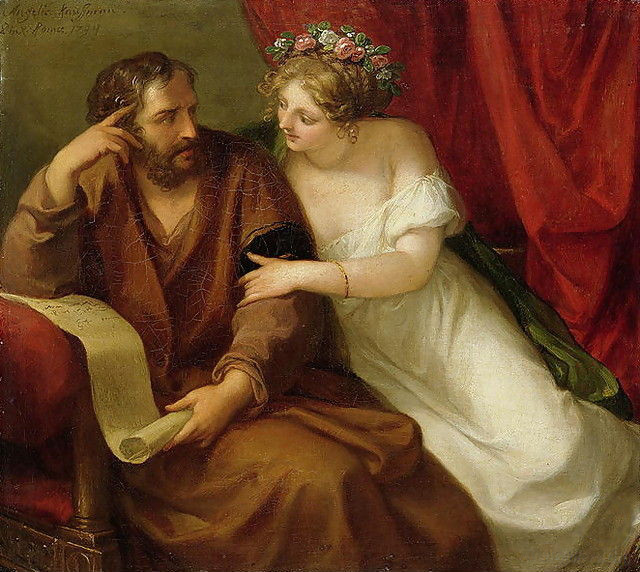
Angelica Kauffman, Phryne Seduces the Philosopher Xenocrates 1794

Jacques-Louis David, Phryne Before the Judges 1818

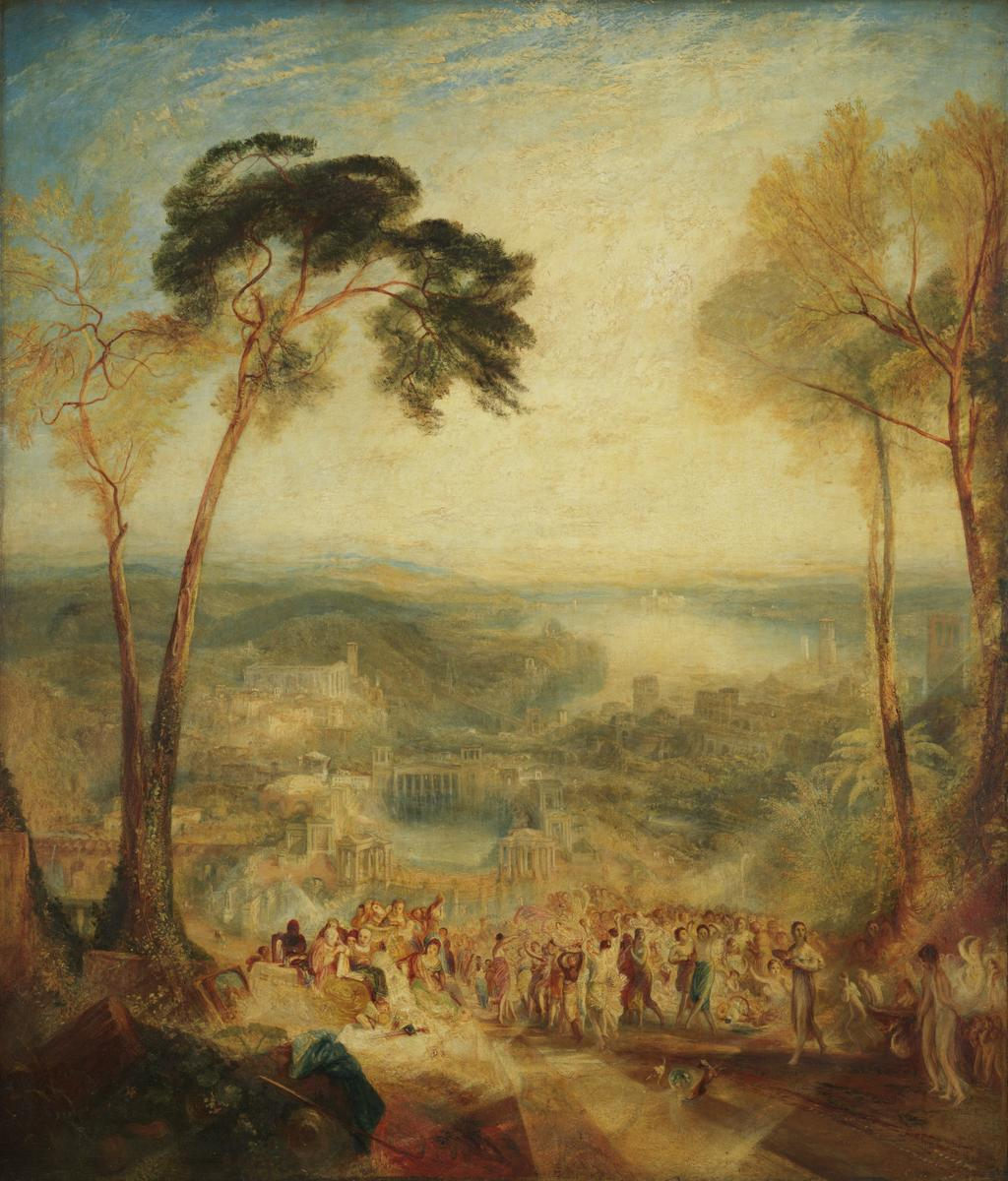
J.M.W. Turner, Phryne Going to the Public Baths as Venus: Demosthenes Taunted by Aeschines 1838

Marie-Christine Leroux as Phryne, photographed by Nadar for Gérôme's Phryne Before the Areopagus 1860–61

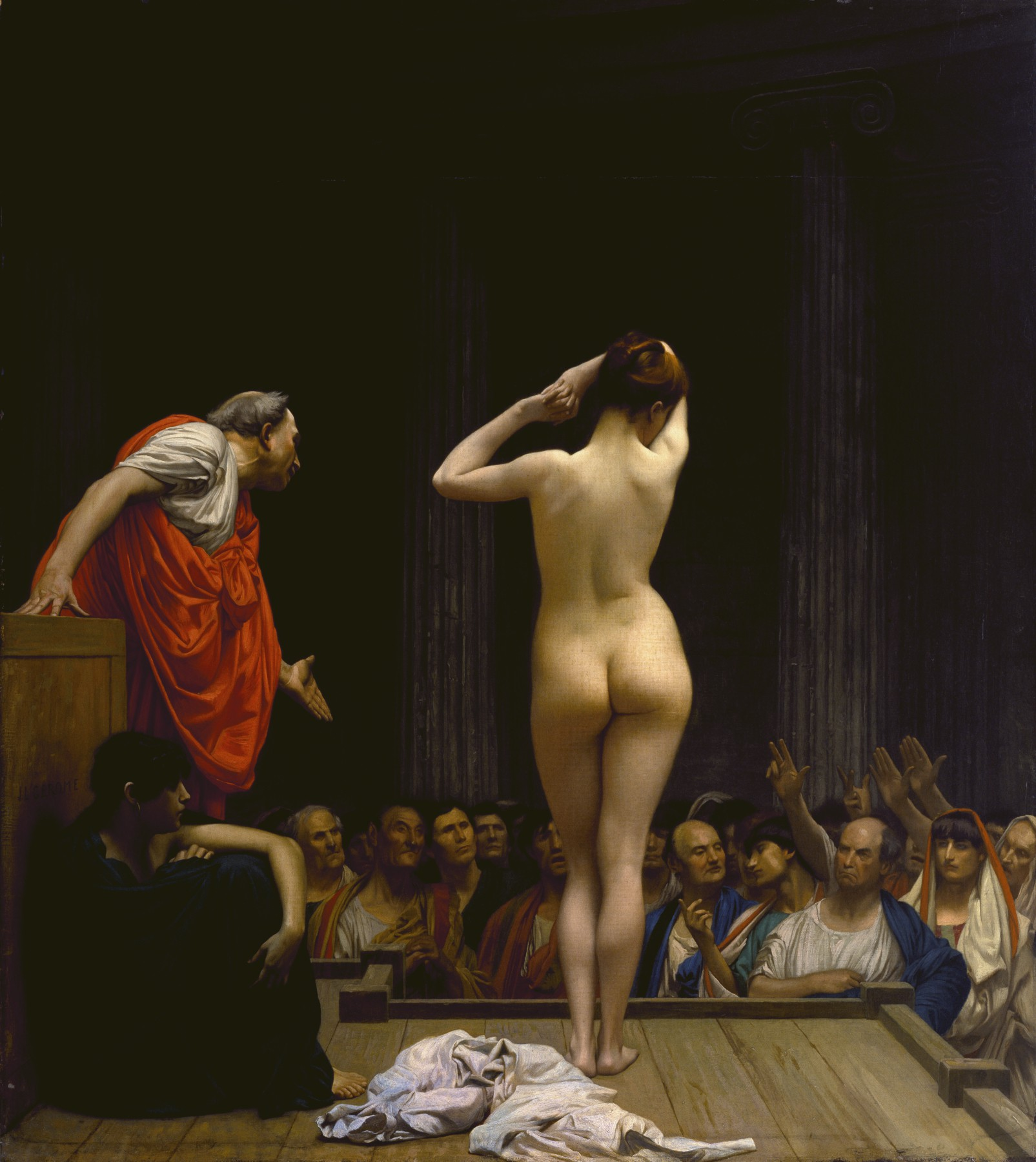
Jean-Léon Gérôme, A Roman Slave Market 1884. One of Gérôme's slave-market paintings showing the slave in the same pose as Phryne.

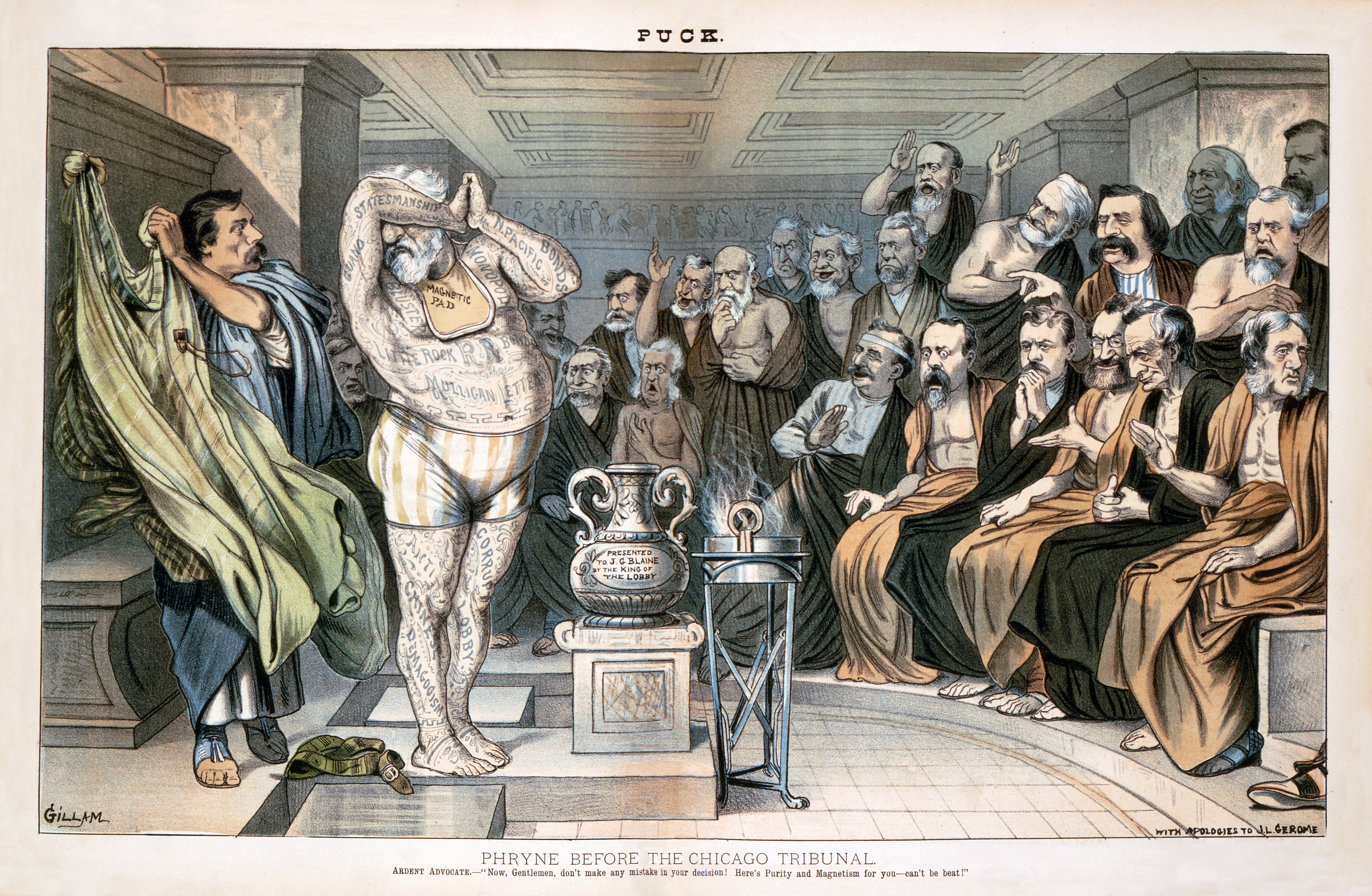
Bernhard Gillam, Phryne Before the Chicago Tribunal, 1884. Gillam's parody of Gérôme's painting depicts the presidential candidate James G. Blaine as Phryne and Whitelaw Reid, the editor of the New York Tribune, as the orator Hypereides exposing his scandals.

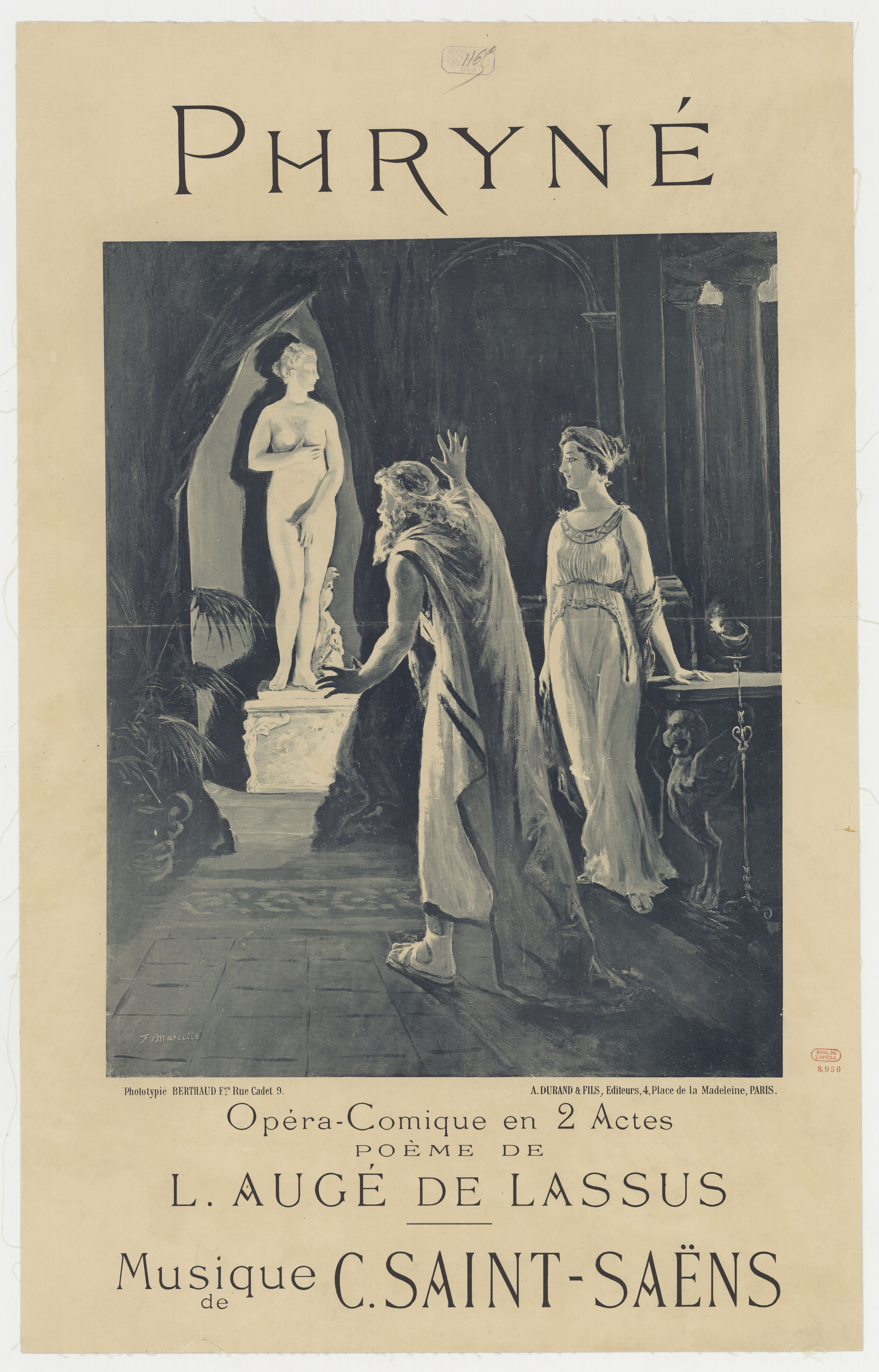
Poster for the comic opera Phryné 1893, with music by Camille Saint-Saëns

== Works cited ==
- Cavallini, Eleonora (2008), "Phryne: Knidian Venus to Movie Star", in Berti, Irene; García Morcillo, Marta (eds.), Hellas on Screen: Cinematic Receptions of Ancien History, Literature, and Myth, Stuttgart: Franz Steiner Verlag, pp. 203–218, ISBN 978-3-515-09223-4
- Cavallini, Eleonora (2014), "Esibizionismo o propaganda politica? Frine tra storia e aneddotica", in Bultrighini, Umberto; Dimauro, Elisabetta (eds.), Donne che contano nella storia greca, Lanciano: Carabba, pp. 129–151, ISBN 978-88-6344-367-7
- Cooper, Craig (1995), "Hyperides and the Trial of Phryne", Phoenix, 49 (4): 303–318, doi:10.2307/1088883, JSTOR 1088883
- Cooper, Craig (2001), "Hyperides", Dinarchus, Hyperides & Lycurgus, translated by Worthington, Ian; Cooper, Craig; Harris, Edward M., Austin: University of Texas Press, pp. 61–68, ISBN 0292791429
- Dalby, Andrew (1996), Siren Feasts: A History of Food and Gastronomy in Greece, London: Routledge, ISBN 0415116201
- Davidson, James (1997), Courtesans and Fishcakes: The Consuming Passions of Classical Athens, London: Harper Collins, ISBN 9780002555913
- Eidinow, Esther (2016), Envy, Poison, and Death: Women on Trial in Classical Athens, Oxford University Press, ISBN 9780199562602
- Funke, Melissa (21 December 2022), "Phryne", Oxford Classical Dictionary, Oxford University Press
- Funke, Melissa (2024), Phryne: A Life in Fragments, London: Bloomsbury Academic, ISBN 9781350371873
- Havelock, Christine Mitchell (1995), The Aphrodite of Knidos and Her Successors: A Historical Review of the Female Nude in Greek Art, Ann Arbor: University of Michigan Press, ISBN 047210585X
- Henderson, Jeffrey (2014), "Comedy in the Fourth Century II: Politics and Domesticity", in Fontaine, Michael; Scafuro, Adele C. (eds.), The Oxford Handbook of Greek and Roman Comedy, Oxford: Oxford University Press, ISBN 9780199743544
- House, John (2008), "History without Values? Gérôme's History Paintings", Journal of the Warburg and Courtauld Institutes, 71: 261–276, ISSN 0075-4390
- Kapparis, Konstantinos (2018), Prostitution in the Ancient Greek World, Berlin: De Gruyter, ISBN 9783110557954
- Kapparis, Konstantinos (2021), Women in the Law Courts of Classical Athens, Edinburgh University Press, ISBN 978-1-4744-4674-7
- Keesling, Catherine (2006), "Heavenly Bodies: Monuments to Prostitutes in Greek Sanctuaries", in Faraone, Christopher; McClure, Laura (eds.), Prostitutes and Courtesans in the Ancient World, Madison: University of Wisconsin Press, pp. 59–76, ISBN 0299213102
- Kennedy, Rebecca Futo (2014), Immigrant Women in Athens: Gender, Ethnicity and Citizenship in the Classical City, New York: Routledge, ISBN 978-0-415-73786-9
- MacDowell, Douglas M. (2012), "Sycophants", Oxford Classical Dictionary, Oxford University Press
- Mahaffey, Kathleen (1970), "Pope's 'Artimesia' and 'Phryne' as Personal Satire", The Review of English Studies, 21 (84): 466–471, ISSN 0034-6551
- McClure, Laura (2014), Courtesans at Table: Gender and Greek Literary Culture in Athenaeus, New York: Routledge, ISBN 9781317794158
- McClure, Laura (2024), Phryne of Thespiae: Courtesan, Muse, and Myth, Oxford University Press, ISBN 9780197580882
- Morales, Helen (2011), "Fantasising Phryne: The Psychology and Ethics of Ekphrasis", The Cambridge Classical Journal, 57 (1): 71–104, doi:10.1017/S1750270500001287, S2CID 145580288
- Nisbet, R. G. M.; Rudd, Niall, eds. (2004), A Commentary on Horace, Odes Book III, Oxford University Press, ISBN 9780199288748
- O'Connell, Peter (2013), "Hyperides and Epopteia: A New Fragment of the Defense of Phryne", Greek, Roman and Byzantine Studies, 53: 90–116
- Olson, S. Douglas (2010), Athenaeus, The Learned Banqueters: Books 12–13.594b, Cambridge, Massachusetts: Harvard University Press, ISBN 978-0-674-99639-7
- Richter, G. M. A. (1984), The Portraits of the Greeks, Oxford: Phaidon, ISBN 0714823260
- Rilke, Rainer Maria (2015), New Poems, translated by Krisak, Len, Rochester, New York: Boydell & Brewer, ISBN 9781782046141
- Ryan, Judith (1993), "More Seductive than Phryne: Baudelaire, Gérôme, Rilke, and the Problem of Autonomous Art", PMLA, 108 (5): 1128–1141, doi:10.2307/462990, JSTOR 462990
- Schachter, Albert (2016) [1990], "Ovid and Boiotia", Boiotia in Antiquity: Selected Papers, Cambridge University Press, pp. 245–252, doi:10.1017/CBO9781107282049.019, ISBN 9781107282049
- Versnel, H. S. (1990), Ter Unus: Isis, Dionysos, Hermes. Three Studies in Henotheism, Leiden: Brill, ISBN 9004092684
- Ziogas, Ioannis (2018), "Law and Literature in the Ancient World: The Case of Phryne", in Dolin, Kieran (ed.), Law and Literature, Cambridge University Press, pp. 79–93, ISBN 9781108386005
