= Phryne at the Festival of Poseidon in Eleusis =

1889 painting by Henryk Siemiradzki

Phryne at the Poseidonia in Eleusis
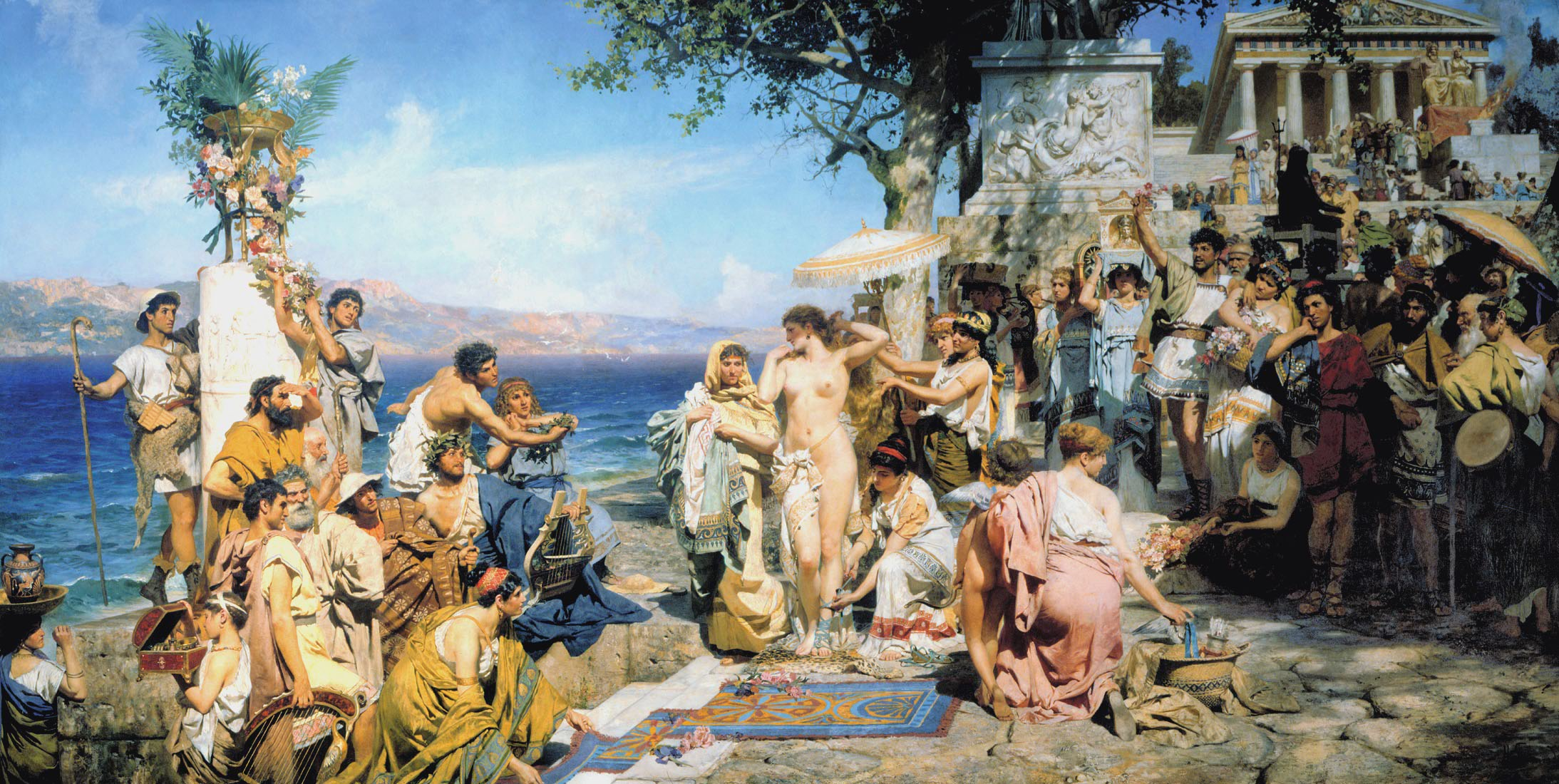
- Artist: Henryk Siemiradzki
- Year: 1889
- Medium: Oil on canvas
- Dimensions: 390 cm × 763.5 cm (150 in × 300.6 in)
- Location: Russian Museum; Saint Petersburg

Phryne at the Festival of Poseidon in Eleusis or Phryne at the Poseidonia in Eleusis (Russian: Фри́на на пра́зднике Посейдо́на в Элевзи́не) is a very large-scale history painting by the Russian-born Polish painter Henryk Siemiradzki, completed in 1889. It is part of the collection of the State Russian Museum, in Saint Petersburg.

The painting depicts an anecdote about the ancient Greek courtesan Phryne, told by Athenaeus in his Deipnosophistae, in which Phryne bathes in the sea at Eleusis, thus inspiring the painter Apelles to paint his Aphrodite Anadyomene. In the painting, Phryne is shown standing nude, her face shaded by a parasol. A crowd of people look at her; in the background is a temple and the sea.
