= Phryné (opera) =

Opéra comique in 2 acts by Camille Saint-Saëns

- Opéra comique by Camille Saint-Saëns
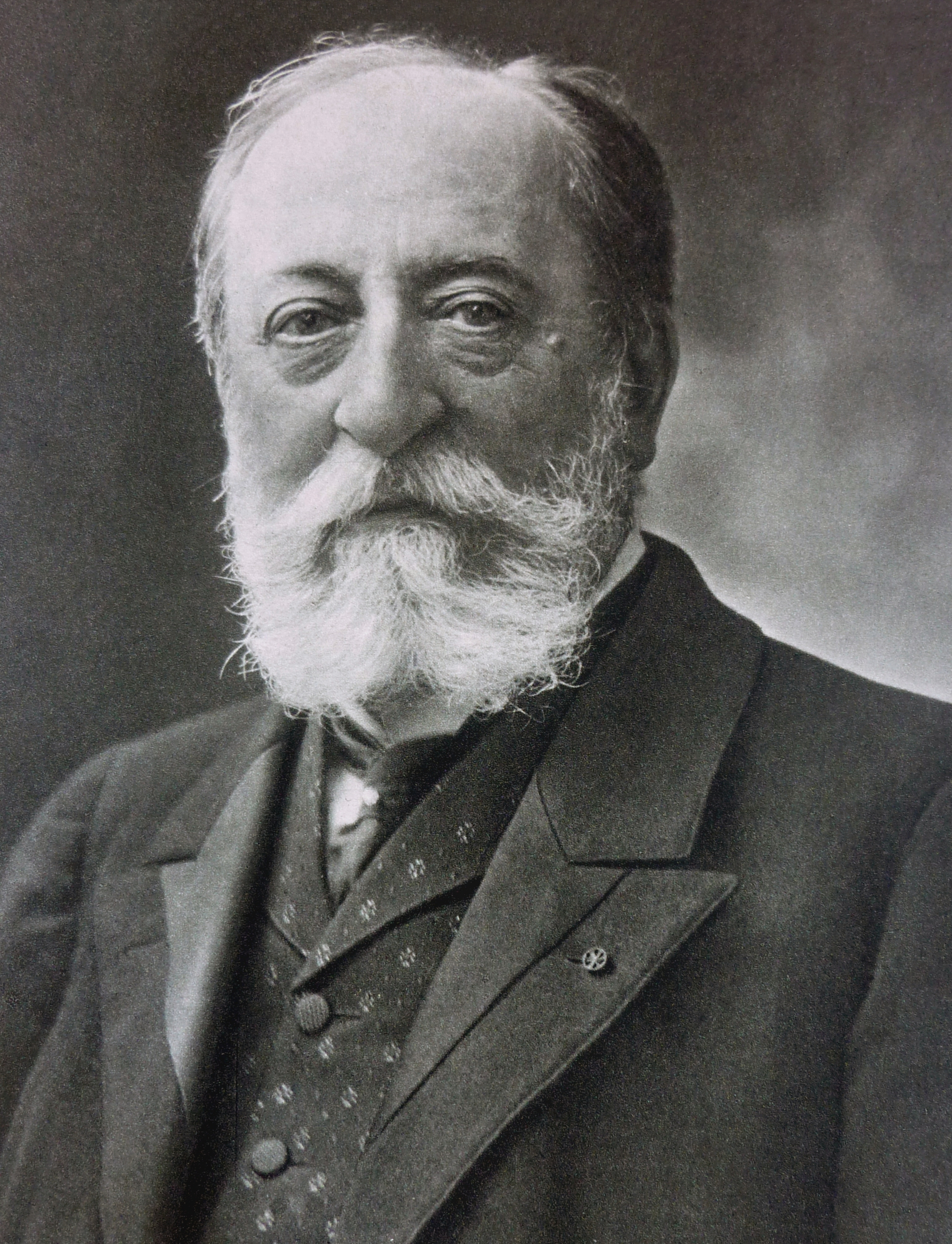
- The composer in 1895
- Librettist: Lucien Augé de Lassus
- Language: French

Phryné is an 1893 opéra comique in 2 acts by Camille Saint-Saëns to a libretto by Lucien Augé de Lassus, based on the life of ancient Greek courtesan Phryne. The role of Phryne was initiated by Sibyl Sanderson.

== Cast ==
- Phryné (soprano)
- Lampito, esclave de Phryné (soprano)
- Dicéphile, archonte (bass)
- Nicias, neveu de Dicéphile (tenor)
- Cynalopex (tenor)
- Agoragine (bass)

== Recordings ==
- Phryné Denise Duval, Nadine Sautereau, Andre Vessieres, Michel Hamel, Orchestre Lyrique de l'O.R.T.F., Chorale Lyrique de l'O.R.T.F. Jules Gressier. 1960
- Phryné was scheduled for revival and recording in June 2021 at the Musée du Louvre by the Opéra de Rouen Orchestra in partnership with the Palazzetto Bru Zane, but cancelled due to the COVID-19 pandemic.
