= Christine Roux =

French art model (c. 1820–1863)

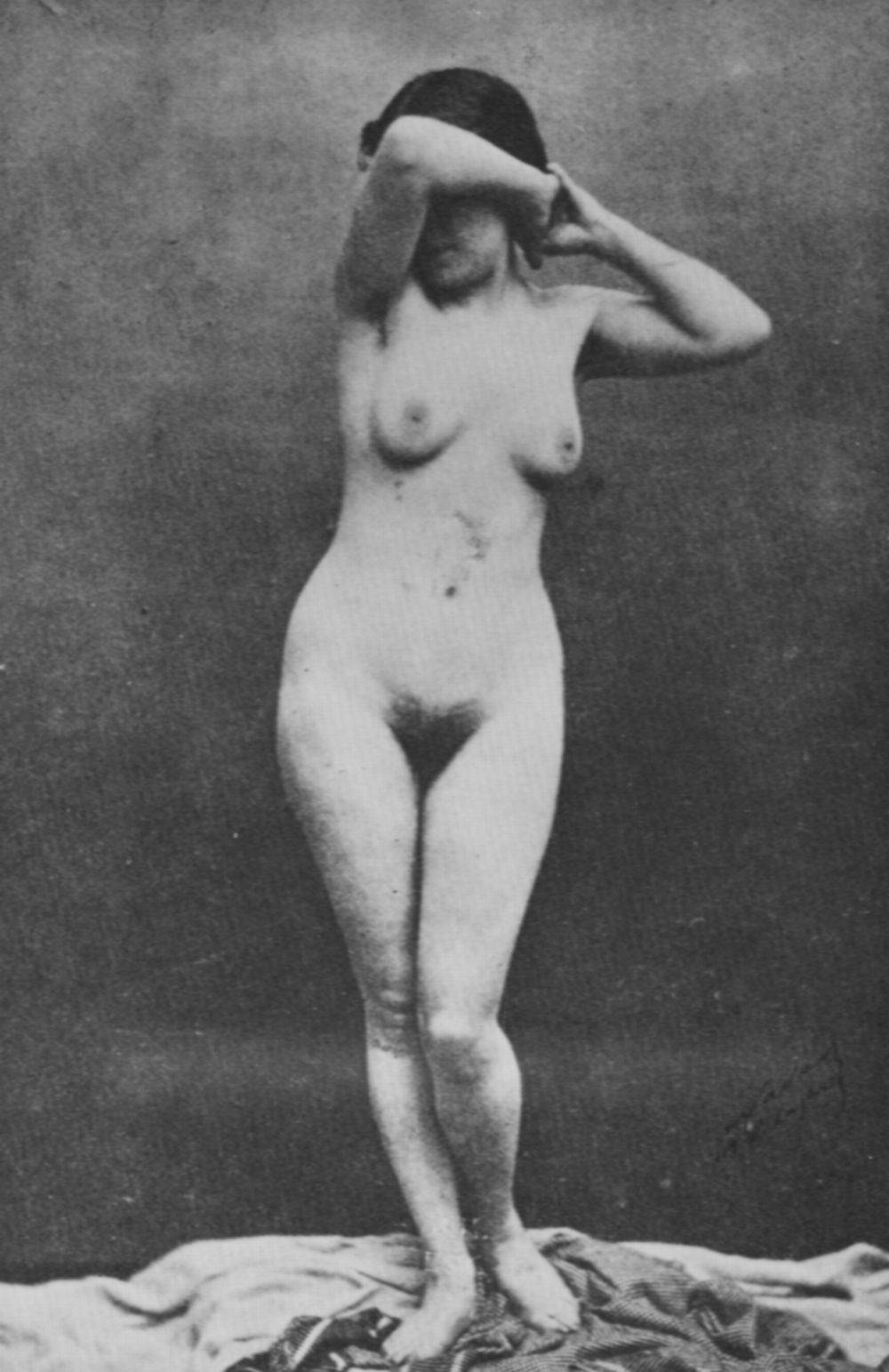
- The famous nude photo of Roux by Nadar (c.1855)
- Born: Marie-Christine Roux (or Marie-Christine Leroux) c. 1820; Lyon, France
- Died: December 3, 1863 (aged 42–43); Shipwreck of the Atlas, headed to Algiers
- Occupations: Courtesan, artist's model, actress
- Known for: Inspiring literary characters like Musette and Mariette, early nude photography model
- Notable work: Posing for photographers like Nadar, potentially inspiring artists like Ingres and Gérôme

Christine Roux (c. 1820 - December 3, 1863) was a French courtesan, artist's model and actress in the 19th century. She was well known in the bohemian, artistic, and literary scenes in Paris throughout the 1840s and until her death.

== Early life and career ==
Christine Roux was born around 1820 in Lyon, France. She later moved with her mother to Paris where she worked as a courtesan and artist's model, eventually gaining a small fortune.

=== Literary connections ===
Roux is believed to have been the inspiration for the character Musette in Henri Murger's novel Scènes de la vie de bohème, which was adapted into the 1896 opera La Bohème by Puccini. The name Musette was chosen by Murger because of Roux's beautiful singing voice.

Roux was present at the premier of Scènes de la vie de bohème at the Théâtre des Variétés on November 9, 1849 alongside one of her lovers who was a political advisor to the prince-president of the time, Napoleon III.

Murger is said to have based another character on Roux, Marianne, in his 1851 book Le Pays Latin.

Writer Jules Champfleury, who had a brief relationship with Roux, is also said to have based the character Mariette in his 1853 work Les Aventures de Mademoiselle Mariette on her. In addition, Champfleury was said to be the inspiration for "Musette's" fictional lover "Marcel" in Murger's novel, Scènes de la vie de bohème.

=== Modeling career ===
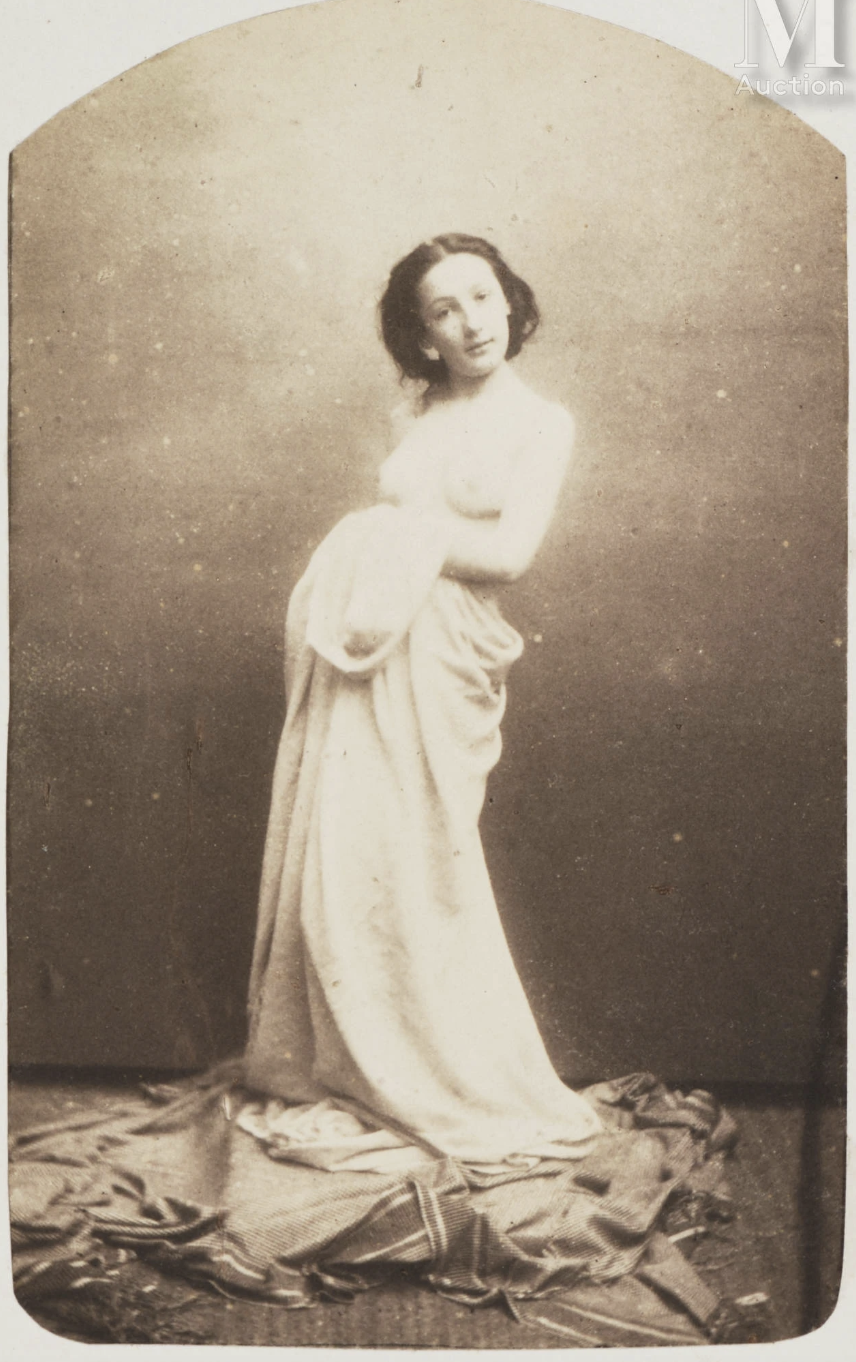
Marie-Christine Roux, nude study [with drapery], for the painter Jean-Léon Gérôme, c. 1855-1859, circa 1855 - 1859

Roux posed as an artist's model for the famous French photographer Gaspard-Félix Tournachon, known as Nadar. One of his photographs from around 1855 titled Mariette depicts Roux standing nude covering her face. This was one of the first nude studies done in the history of photography. Another Nadar photo called Musette may show Roux seated. She also posed for sculptor Auguste Clésinger.

Art historian Helmut Gernsheim claimed Nadar's nude photo of Roux inspired the female figure in Ingres' 1856 painting La Source, alleging Ingres sent Roux to Nadar for studies that year. However, other sources dispute this timeline, stating La Source was conceived much earlier around 1820 and based on Ingres' 1848 Venus Anadyomene, with the model potentially being Ingres' concierge's daughter.

The pose in Nadar's photo of Roux bears similarity to the nude Phryne in Jean-Léon Gérôme's 1861 painting Phryne Before the Areopagus. She was said to have been the model for this painting. Some sources suggest Roux may have previously modeled for Gérôme, providing the face of the Greek girl in his 1846 work The Cockfight. Contemporary writer Alexandre Schanne described Roux as "beautiful, positively beautiful."

== Death ==
In the evening of December 3, 1863, Christine Roux embarked on the steamship Atlas headed from Marseille to Algiers. During the night, the ship sank with 20 passengers and 26 crew members. Roux died in this tragic shipwreck.

== Related works ==
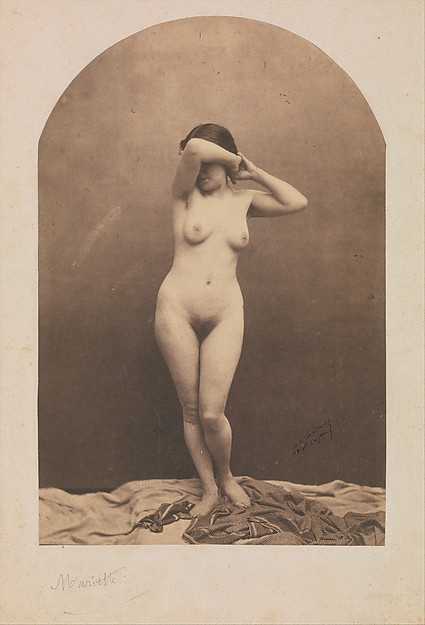
The famous nude photo of Roux by Nadar (c.1855)

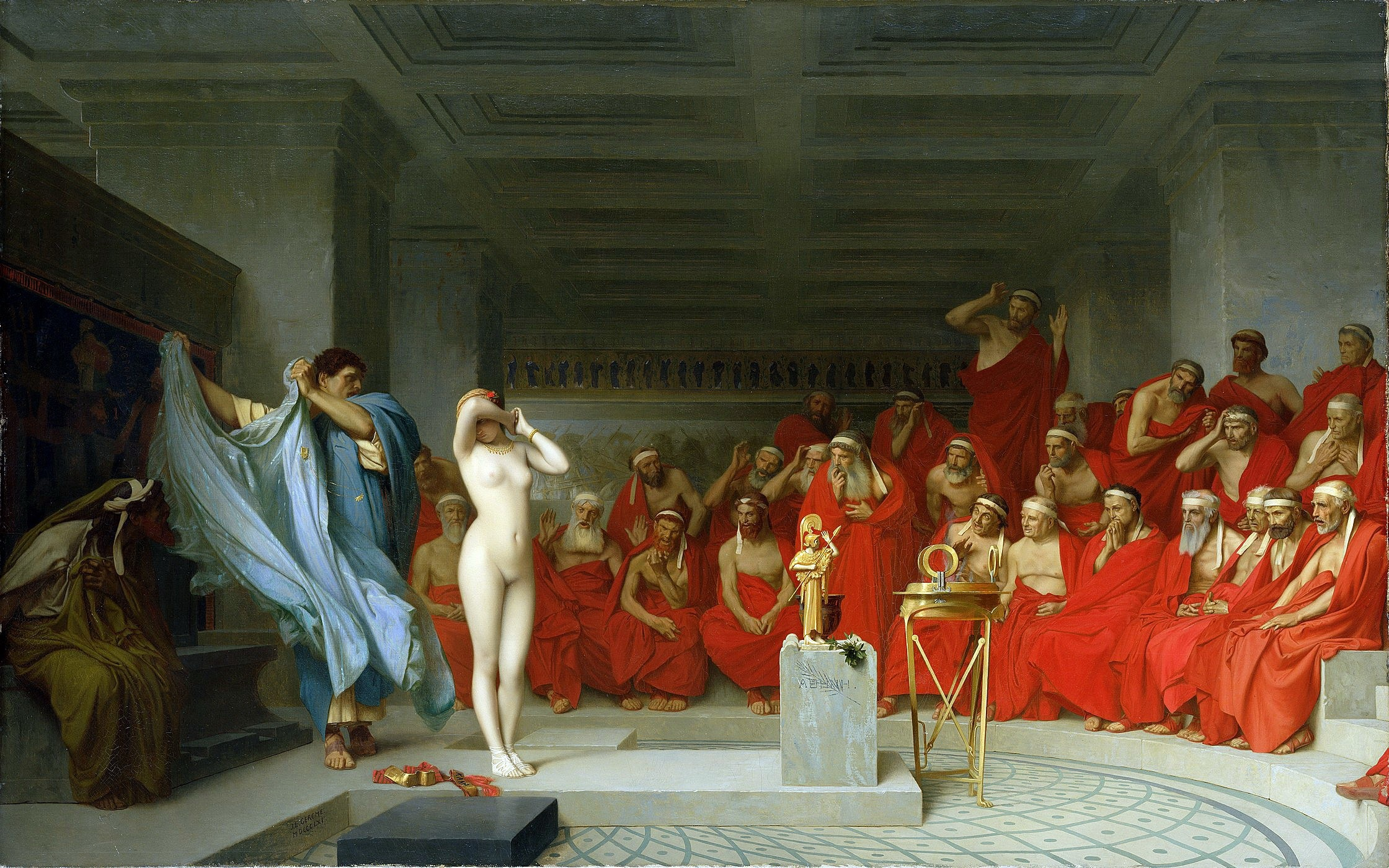
Phryne at the Areopagus, Jean-Leon Gérôme.

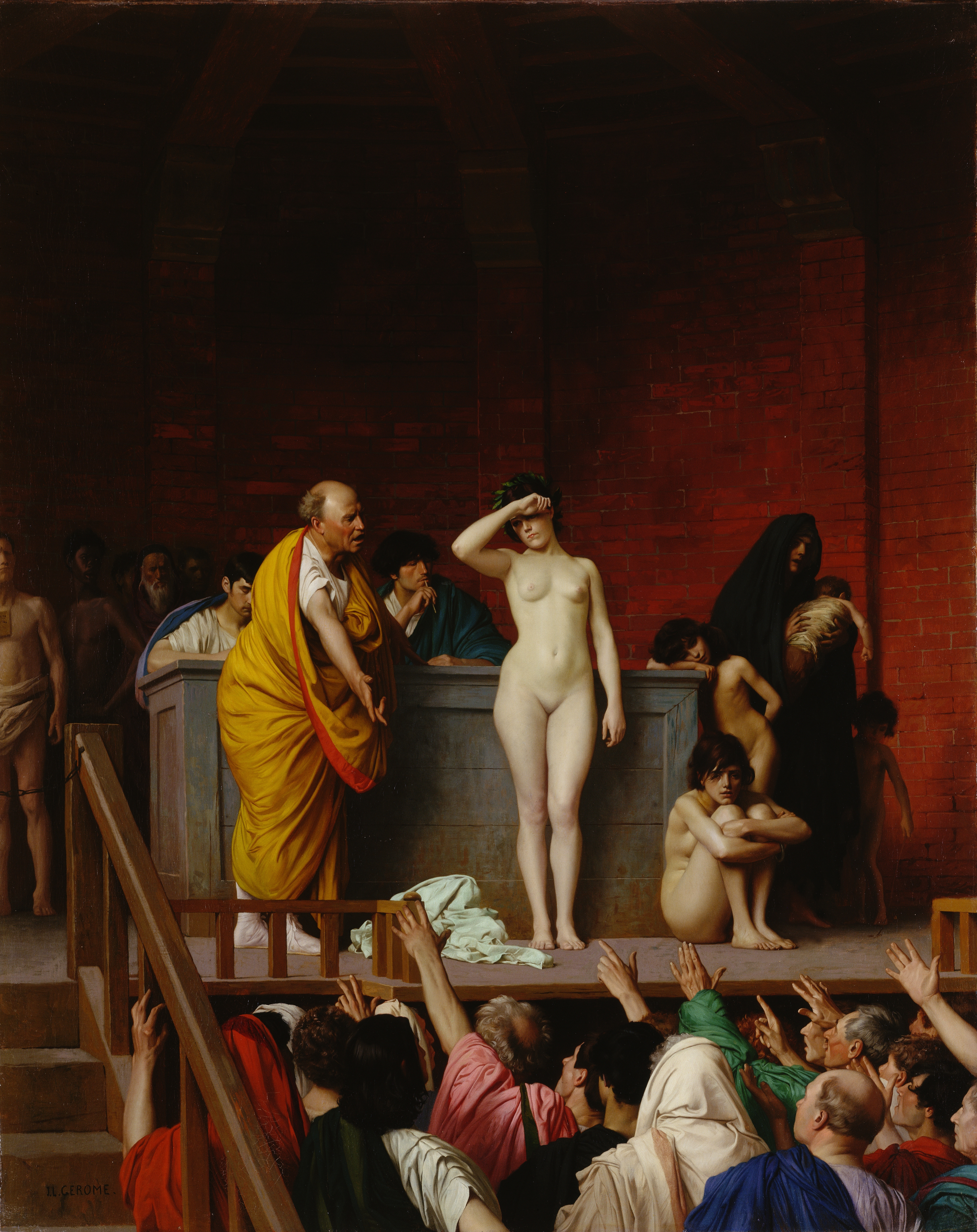
Selling Slaves in Rome, Jean-Leon Gérôme.

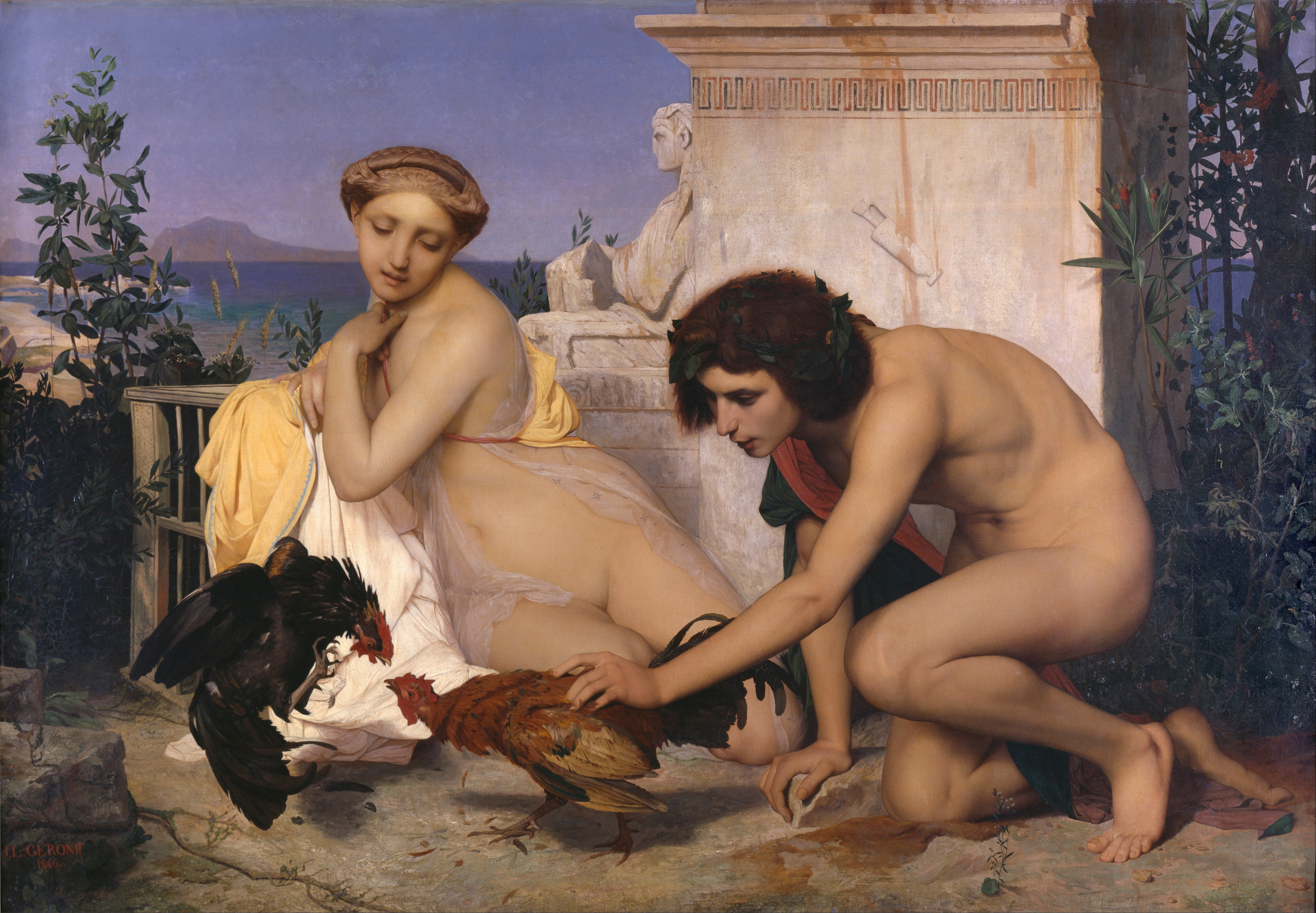
The Cock Fight by Jean-Léon Gérôme (1846)

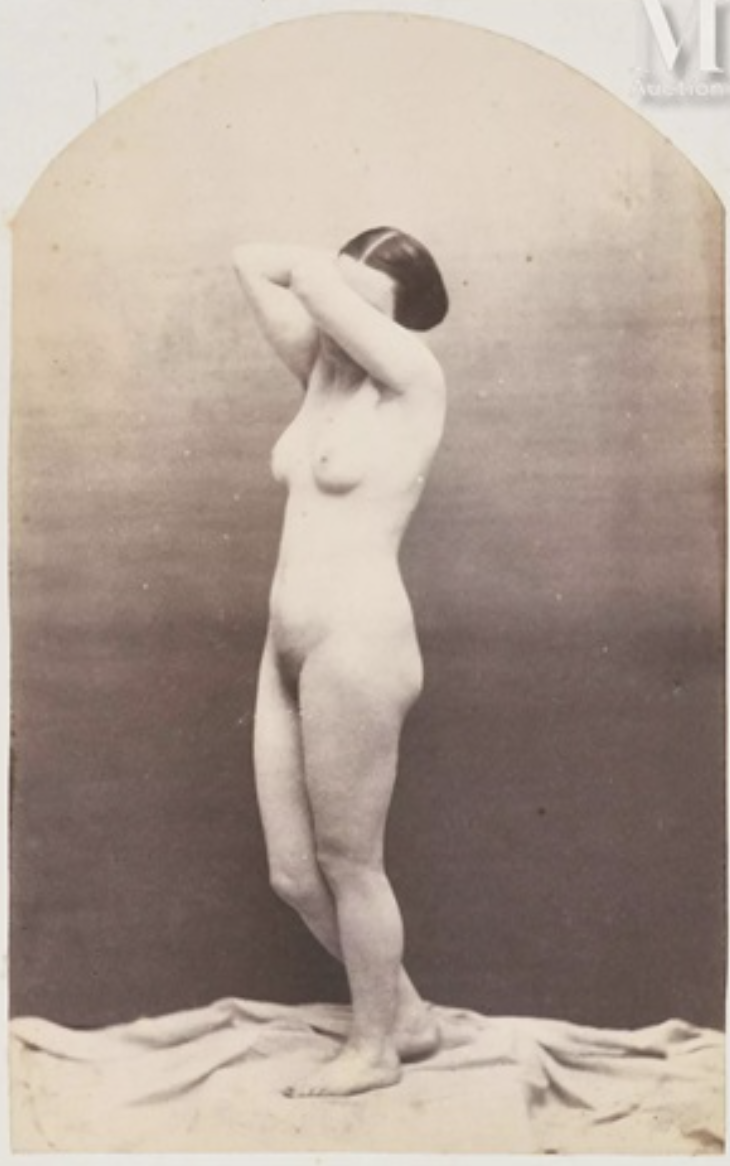
Marie-Christine Roux, nude study [face hidden], for the painter Jean-Léon Gérôme, c. 1855-1859, ca. 1855–1859

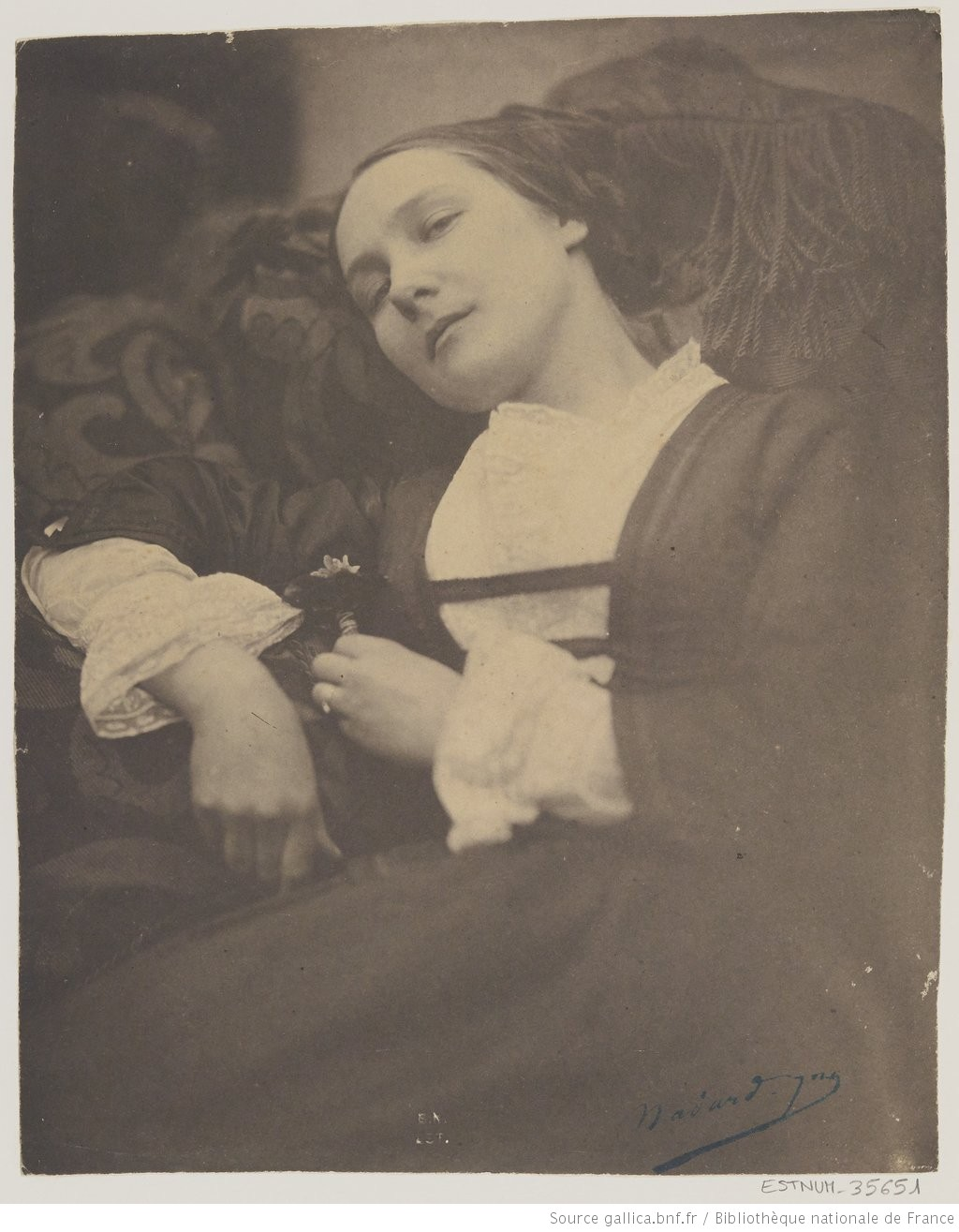
A probable portrait of Christine Roux by Nadar (c. 1854/1855)
