= Ninos (priestess) =

Ancient Athenian woman

Ninos (Note: Ninos' name is given in the surviving sources only in the accusative, as Ninon (Νινον); the nominative is uncertain. Most scholars call her Ninos.) was an ancient woman executed in Athens at some point in the classical period. Her case is known through mentions in three speeches by Demosthenes; further information about her case is supplied by Dionysius of Halicarnassus and possibly Josephus.

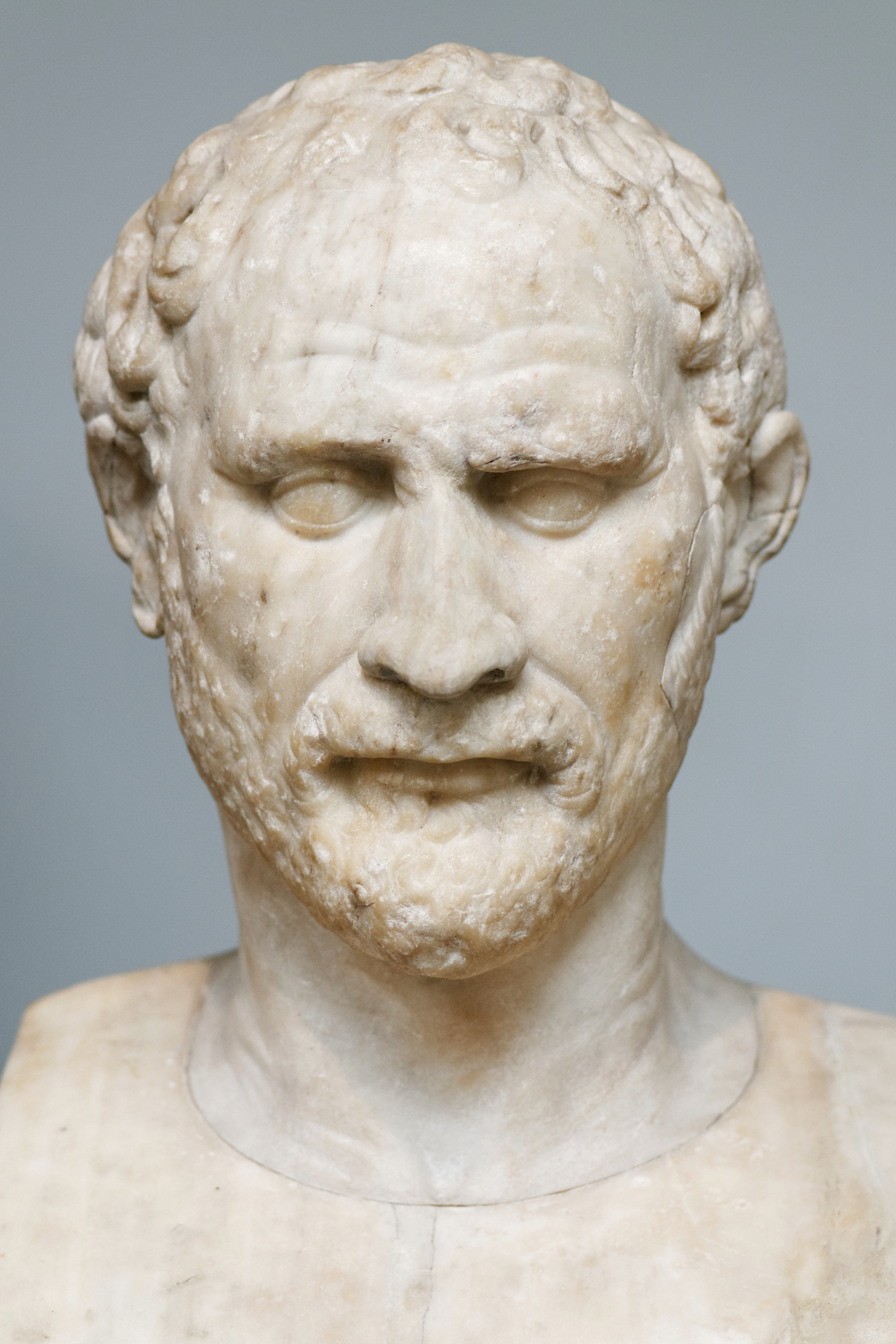
The case of Ninos is mentioned in three of Demosthenes' speeches

== Sources ==
Ninos' case is known through three mentions in speeches by Demosthenes – Against Boeotus I and II, and On the False Embassy. Further information is supplied by two scholia on On the False Embassy, and Dionysius of Halicarnassus in his discussion of the speech Against Menecles which was wrongly attributed to Deinarchus. She may also be mentioned in a passage of Josephus, though this relies on an emendation of the preserved text and is not certain.

== Status ==
A scholion on a speech by Demosthenes describes Ninos as a hieria ('priestess'). Konstantinos Kapparis argues that as she was described as a priestess she was probably an Athenian citizen. However, her unusual name and the fact that none of the sources mention a kurios ('guardian') might suggest that she was a metic (a non-citizen long-term resident in Athens) instead.

== Trial ==
Both of Demosthenes' speeches against Boeotus describe Menecles as the prosecutor of Ninos. The date of the prosecution is uncertain: Against Boeotus I was delivered in 348, which provides a terminus ante quem; Esther Eidinow suggests a date of between 362 and 358 BC. The case was apparently well known in the mid-fourth century, as Demosthenes refers to it in his speeches as if the jury are expected to be familiar with the case. Menecles would go on to be prosecuted in turn by Ninos' son.

In On the False Embassy, Demosthenes mentions a priestess who was charged with bringing together thiasoi; one of the scholia on this passage names this priestess as Ninos. The scholia provide two different explanations for Ninos' crime: one says that her crime was mocking the Dionysian Mysteries; another says that she made love potions. It is unclear where the scholiast's information about love potions comes from – Eidinow suggests that it is a misinterpretation of Demosthenes' text, while Matthew Dickie says that the comment "does not emerge from anything in the text of Demosthenes" and may have been derived from an Atthidographer or another speech. Whatever its derivation, Derek Collins is skeptical of the scholiast's report, arguing that manufacturing love potions was not a criminal offence.

Finally, Josephus lists Ninos as one of five Athenians put to death for asebeia (impiety).

== Works cited ==
- Collins, Derek (2001), "Theoris of Lemnos and the Criminalization of Magic in Fourth-Century Athens", The Classical Quarterly, 5 (1): 477–493, doi:10.1093/cq/51.2.477, JSTOR 3556523
- Dickie, Matthew (2003), Magic and Magicians in the Greco-Roman World, London: Routledge
- Eidinow, Esther (2010), "Patterns of Persecution: 'Witchcraft' Trials in Classical Athens", Past & Present (208): 9–35, doi:10.1093/pastj/gtq001, JSTOR 40783312
- Eidinow, Esther (2016), Envy, Poison, and Death: Women on Trial in Ancient Athens, Oxford: Oxford University Press
- Filonik, Jakub (2013), "Athenian Impiety Trials: A Reappraisal", Dike, 16, doi:10.13130/1128-8221/4290
- Kapparis, Konstantinos (2021), Women in the Law Courts of Classical Athens, Edinburgh: Edinburgh University Press, ISBN 978-1-4744-4674-7
- McClure, Laura (2024), Phryne of Thespiae: Courtesan, Muse, and Myth, Oxford: Oxford University Press, ISBN 9780197580882
