= Posidippus (comic poet) =

Posidippus of Cassandreia (Greek: Ποσείδιππος ὁ Κασσανδρεύς, Poseidippos ho Kassandreus; 316 – c. 250 BC) was a Greek comic poet of the New Comedy.

== Life ==
He was the son of Cyniscus, a Macedonian who lived in Athens. He produced his first play in the third year after Menander had died (289 BC). Cooks held an important position in his list of characters. According to Aulus Gellius, Latin comic poets had imitated Posidippus. His success is shown in a beautiful portrait and sitting statue in the Vatican, which is considered a masterpiece of classical art.

In studying Posidippus' language, Augustus Meineke has detected some new words and old words used in a new sense, completely unknown to the best Attic writers.

== Works ==
The Suda states that Posidippus wrote forty plays, of which the following eighteen titles (along with associated fragments) are preserved.

- Ἀναβλέπων (Anablepon) — The One Who Sees Again
- Ἀποκλειομένη (Apokleiomene) — The Barred Woman
- Γαλάτης (Galates) — The Gaul
- Δήμοται (Demotai) — Citizens
- Ἑρμαφρόδιτος (Hermaphroditos) — Hermaphroditus
- Ἐπίσταθμος (Epistathmos) — Harmost or Symposiarch
- Ἐφεσία (Ephesia) — The Ephesian Girl
- Κώδων (Codon) — The Bell
- Λοκρίδες (Locrides) — The Locrian Women
- Μεταφερόμενοι (Metapheromenoi) — The Transported Ones
- Μύρμηξ (Myrmex) — The Ant
- Ὅμοιοι (Homoioi) — People Who Resemble Each Other
- Παιδίον (Paidion) — The Little Child
- Πορνοβοσκός (Pornoboscos) — The Pimp
- Σύντροφοι (Syntrophoi) — Comrades
- Φιλόσοφοι (Philosophoi) — Philosophers
- Φιλοπάτωρ (Philopator) — The Father-loving
- Χορεύουσαι (Choreuousai) — Dancing Girls

== Quotations ==
But Posidippus the comic writer, in his Pornoboscus, says: "The man who never went to sea has never shipwrecked been. But we have been more miserable than monomachs."

Now the comic poet Posidippus says of her these words, in The Woman from Ephesus (Ephesia): "Phryne was once the most illustrious of us courtesans by far. And even though you are too young to remember that time, you must at least have heard of her trial. Although she was thought to have wrought too great injury to men's lives, she nevertheless captured the court when tried for her life, and, clasping the hands of the judges, one by one, she with the help of her tears saved her life at last."

== Posidippus sculpture ==
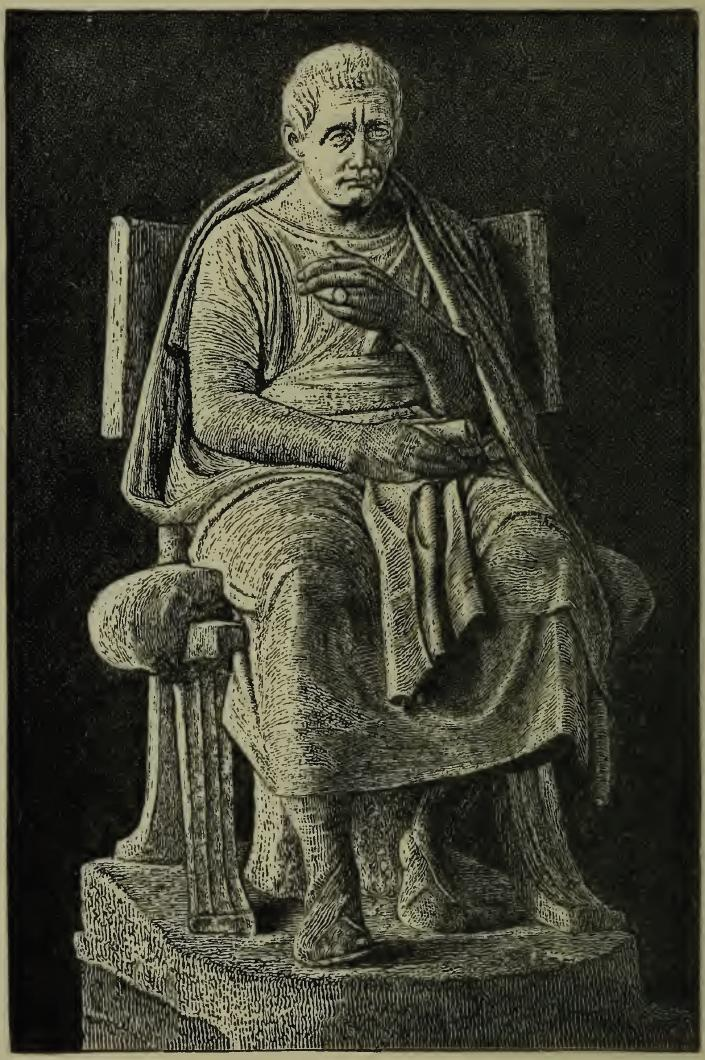
Portrait of Posidippus

His statue in the Vatican is considered a masterpiece of ancient art.
