= Asebeia =

Ancient Greek criminal charge for impiety

Asebeia (Ancient Greek: ἀσέβεια) was a criminal charge in ancient Greece for the "desecration and mockery of divine objects", for "irreverence towards the state gods" and disrespect towards parents and dead ancestors. In English, the word is typically translated as 'impiety' or 'ungodliness'. Most evidence for it comes from ancient Athens.

The antonym of asebeia is eusebeia (εὐσέβεια), which can be translated as "piety". As piety was the generally desired and expected form of behaviour and mindset, being called and regarded impious (ἀσεβής) was already a form of punishment.

== Trials in Athens ==
Every single citizen, including a third party, could bring this charge (graphē asebeias) to the Archon basileus. Instead of a single law or text defining the charge and proceedings to take place in case of asebeia, there is an array of texts in which it appears. Plutarch, Polybios, Demosthenes and Aristotle refer to it in their texts.

The trials were publicly held at the Heliaia and were split into two steps: first the jury (heliasts or dikastes) voted on whether the accused was guilty; if the majority found them guilty, because the laws did not prescribe a fixed punishment, the jury at the Heliaia would then decide on the punishment. Known punishments were fines, exile, death, property confiscation and atimia (disfranchisement), with death being the most common sentence. There was no right to appeal the sentence made. Sentences were carried out or supervised by the magistrates from the eleven tribes: The Eleven (οἱ ἕνδεκα). The following ancient Greeks were accused or allegedly accused (as the sources are ambiguous) of asebeia:

- Aeschylus (acquitted)
- Anaxagoras (acquitted, exiled, or sentenced to death in absentia)
- Andocides was acquitted in 399 or 400 BCE.
- Aristotle (fled before trial)
- Aspasia (acquitted)
- Hermocopidae: vandalizers of the Athenian hermae in 415 BCE. 22 individuals were sentenced to death.
- Alcibiades (sentenced to death, but fled)
- Demades (fined)
- Diagoras of Melos (fled Athens)
- Euripides
- Ninos (according to Josephus, executed for introducing foreign gods to Athens; the charge may have been asebeia)
- Phryne (acquitted)
- Protagoras (allegedly sentenced to death or exile)
- Socrates: sentenced to death, and executed in 399 BCE.
- Theodorus the Atheist
- Theophrastus (Diogenes Laertius reports that the charge was so unpopular that "the prosecutor himself narrowly escaped punishment")
- Theoris of Lemnos (executed; Philochorus claims that the charge against her was asebeia)

=== Historicity ===
Even though the above individuals were alleged to have been accused of asebeia in different later sources, there is a lack of historical evidence and it was suggested that some of the accusations might have been fabricated by historians and other writers in later periods.

== Outside Athens ==
Outside Athens, asebeia was possibly seen as a wrong state of mind rather than a crime.

== See also ==
- Graphe paranomon

== Bibliography ==
- Filonik, J. (2013). Athenian impiety trials: a reappraisal. Dike-Rivista di Storia del Diritto Greco ed Ellenistico, 16, 11–96.
- Leão, Delfim. (2012). “Asebeia”, in Roger S. Bagnall, Kai Brodersen, Craige B. Champion, Andrew Erskine, and Sabine R. Huebner (eds.), The Encyclopedia of Ancient History (Oxford, Wiley-Blackwell, 2012), 815–816. 10.1002/9781444338386.wbeah17057.
