= Jean-Baptiste-Henri Deshays =

French painter (1729–1765)

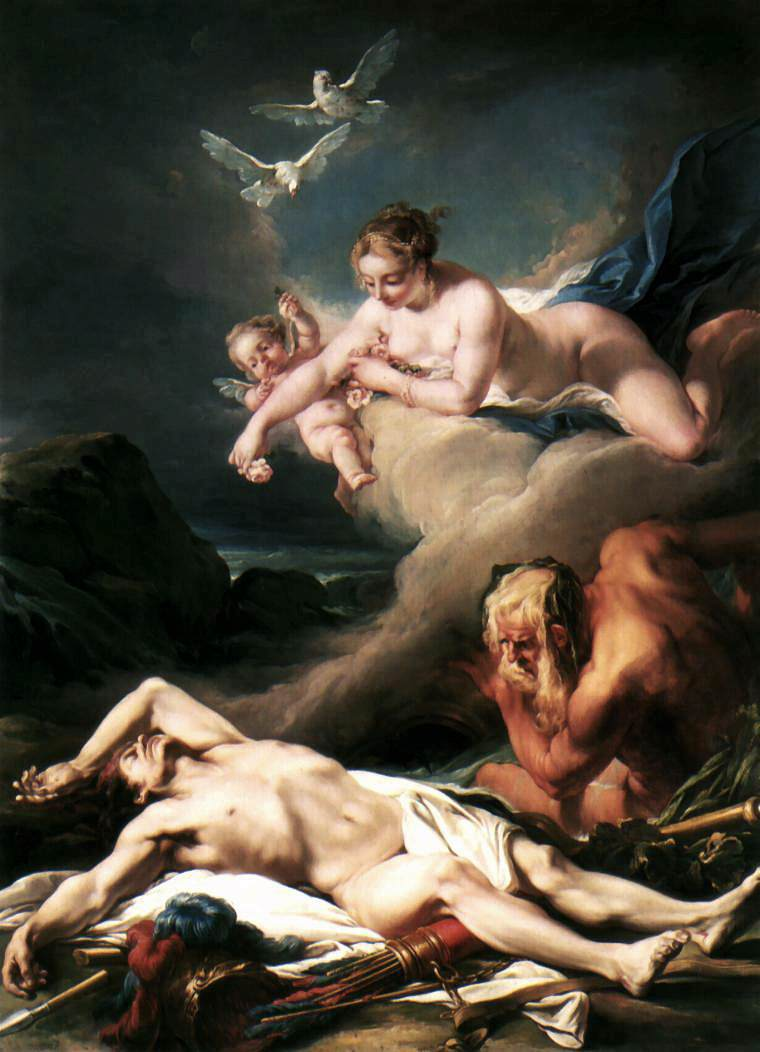
Hector Exposed on the Banks of the Xanthus River, 1759, by Jean-Baptiste-Henri Deshays (Musée Fabre, Montpellier)

Jean-Baptiste-Henri Deshays or Deshayes (1729 – 10 February 1765) was a French painter of religious and mythological subjects.

== Life ==
Deshays was born in Colleville, near Rouen. His first training was by his father, the minor Rouen painter Jean-Dominique Deshays. He then studied for a short time under Jean-Baptiste Descamps at his Ecole Gratuite de Dessin. He spent time in Hyacinthe Collin de Vermont's Paris studio from around 1740 to 1749 and Jean Restout II's from late 1749 to 1751. Both of these artists had been pupils of Jean Jouvenet and painted in the Grand Style of French history painting, a style Deshays adopted as his own.

In 1750, while he was in Restout's studio, Deshays won second prize in the Grand Prix de Rome competition with his painting Laban Giving his Daughter in Marriage to Jacob. He was awarded first prize in 1751 for Job on the Dung-hill. Deshays served the compulsory three years training at the Ecole des Eleves Protégés (where he learnt from Carle van Loo, its director, and attracted some religious commissions, including two vast canvases, a Visitation and an Annunciation, for the monastery of the Visitation at Rouen), before going to Rome. He then spent four years under Charles-Joseph Natoire at the French Academy in Rome, making several copies of works by Raphael, Domenichino, Guercino and the Carracci. On Deshays' return to Paris in 1758, he married Boucher's elder daughter, and a year later became a full academician. He exhibited at four official Salons before his death in Paris in 1765.
