= Lion of Knidos =

Ancient Greek statue

Coordinates: 51.5190°N 0.1270°W

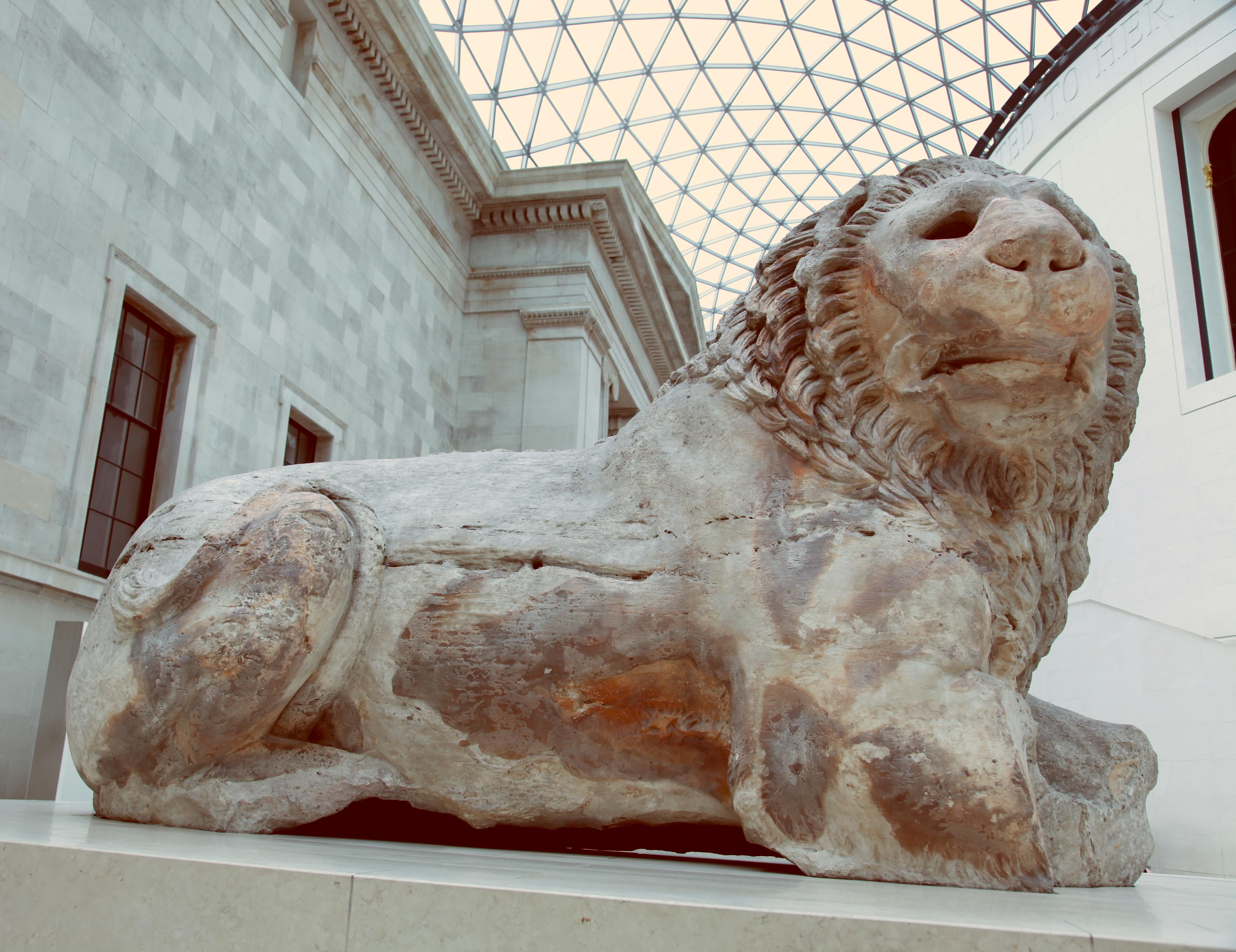
- Lion of Knidos
- Material: Marble
- Size: 2.89 m long by 1.82 m high
- Created: c. 350–200 BC
- Present location: British Museum, London
- Registration: 1859,1226.24

The Lion of Knidos is the name for a colossal ancient Greek statue erected near the ancient port of Knidos, south-west Asia Minor (now near Datça in Turkey). Although there is some debate about the age of the sculpture, in general, scholarly opinion dates it to the 2nd century BC. Since 2000, it has been prominently displayed on a plinth under the roof of the Queen Elizabeth II Great Court because soon after it was seen by British archaeologists in 1858, the statue was taken by the British to London where it became part of the British Museum's collection.

== Description ==
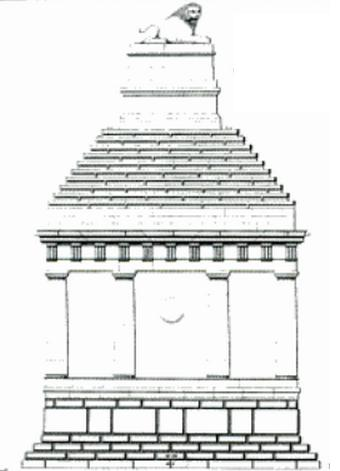
Pullan's sketch of his conjectural reconstruction of the funerary monument as first built. It is estimated to be 18 metres high and faced in marble. The lion weighs 6 tons.

This sculpture of a recumbent lion was quarried from Mount Pentelikon near Athens, the same marble used to build the Parthenon. The lion is substantially complete; only the lower jaw and front legs are missing; its eyes were probably once inlaid with glass. The statue is greater than life-size; it weighs six tonnes and measures 2.89 metres long and 1.82 metres high. In designing the body to be hollowed out from below, the weight of the statue was reduced.

The statue stood on top of a funerary monument that is of a style fashionable in 350 BC in Halikarnassos, a centre that was only a day away by boat. The monument is square with a stepped pyramidal top. It was hollow on a circular plan. This similarity has led to some experts dating the statue to 350 BC, but others think that the statue was above a cenotaph made to commemorate the nearby naval Battle of Cnidus of 394 BC, in which the Athenian general, Conon, commanding a joint Athenian and Persian fleet, was victorious over a Spartan fleet led by Peisander.

A third opinion is that the architecture of the monument is not typical of 250 BC, but is Doric and dates from 175 BC. This variation is summarised in the British Museum's estimate of 200-250 BC as its age. The rest of the monument is still in Turkey where it has been excavated by the British Museum. It was originally 12 metres square. Excavations at the site, and similar monuments nearby, have failed to find an artefact or inscription that would more definitely date the statue.

== Excavation and Removal ==
The Lion of Knidos was first seen by a British person in 1858 when the archaeologist Richard Popplewell Pullan walked the cliffs near what is now the Turkish town of Datça. Pullan was helping Charles Thomas Newton excavate the ancient Greek city of Knidos three miles away. The statue had crowned an 18-metre high funerary monument, which had commanding views over the sea and may have once acted as a navigation aid for passing sailors. The monument may have been destroyed in an earthquake, as the statue was found lying some distance from the tomb. The Knidos Lion was transported with some difficulty further down the coast, where it was loaded onto the naval ship HMS Supply by Robert Murdoch Smith and shipped to London.

Smith's role was significant, as he was presented with a large statue that had fallen onto its front face. The limestone core of the monument was still there but the marble facing lay around where it had fallen. Smith was able to replace and move each of the remaining stones which allowed Pullan, who was a trained architect, to sketch what is thought to be a good reproduction of what the whole structure would have looked like.

In 2008, the Turkish town of Datça petitioned the British Ministry of Culture and Tourism for the return of the two statues known as the Lion of Knidos and the Demeter of Knidos.
