= Cape Deveboynu, Datça =

Promontory in southwest Turkey

Coordinates: 36°41′06″N 27°22′06″E

Deveboynu Cape (Turkish Deveboynu Burnu; Greek Krio; Ancient Greek: Τριόπιον, romanized: Triopion; Latin: Triopium and Triopia) is a promontory in southwest Turkey, on the Aegean Sea, at the extreme end of the Datça Peninsula, north of the island of Rhodes. The modern town of Tekir is located there.
