= Temple of Aphrodite, Knidos =

Sanctuary dedicated to goddess Aphrodite

Coordinates: 36°41′20″N 27°22′24″E

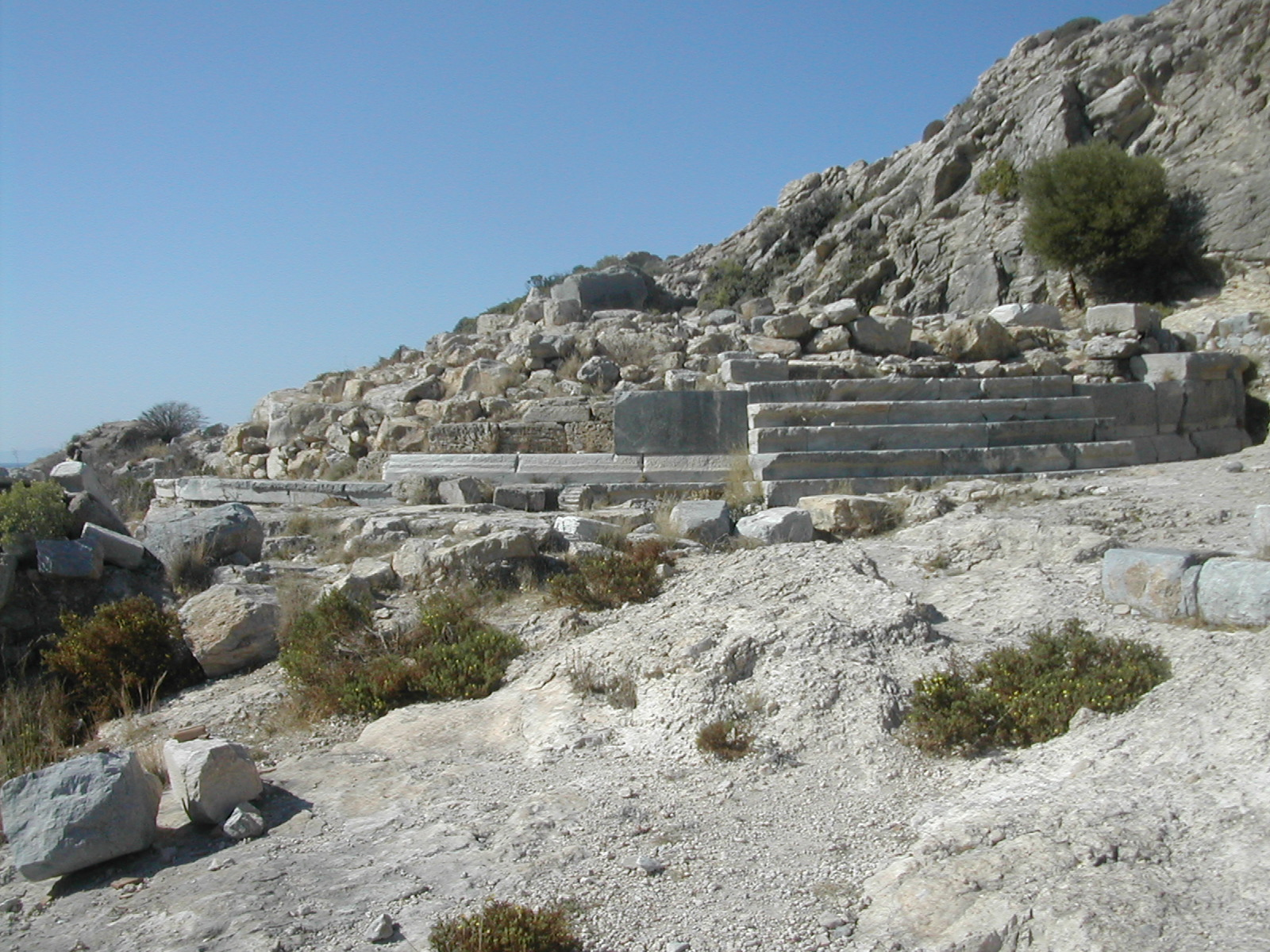
Base of the Temple of Aphrodite

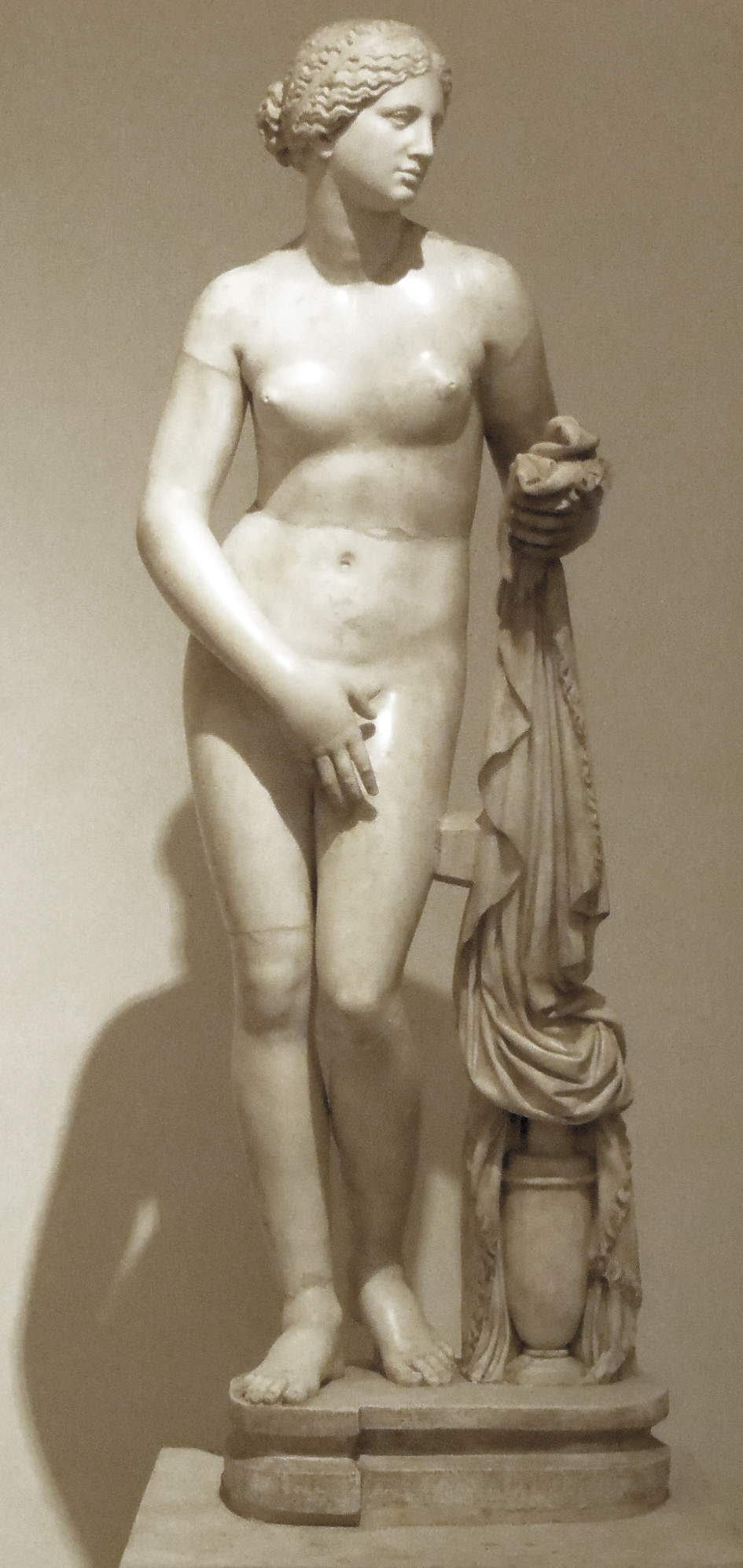
Aphrodite of Knidos

The Temple of Aphrodite Euploia was a sanctuary in ancient Knidos (Modern day Datça Turkey) dedicated to the goddess Aphrodite. It was a famous pilgrimage, known for hosting the famous statue of Aphrodite of Knidos.

The sanctuary was dedicated to the goddess under her name Aphrodite Euploia or 'Aphrodite of the Fair Voyage', which was her name in her capacity of a sea goddess, an aspect very popular among sailors.

It was a significant sanctuary, famous in the ancient world for hosting the first cult statue of the goddess depicted naked, which was sculptured by Praxiteles in 365 BC. As such, it became a place of pilgrimage, and continued to be so during the Roman Empire. It was a circular Doric temple surrounded with colonnades. Unusually, the temple had doors also at the back, and the statue was not placed in the end of the hall of the temple's cella, but in the middle of the circular temple, making it possible for pilgrims to see the statue from all angles. Around the temple, couches were placed among fragrant bushes, to make it possible for people to make love. The famous temple was the role model for a copy erected at Emperor Hadrian's Villa in Tivoli.

Pausanias wrote:

The Knidians hold Aphrodite in very great honor, and they have sanctuaries of the goddess; the oldest is to her as Doritis (Bountiful ), the next in age as Akraia (Of the Height), while the newest is to the Aphrodite called Knidia by men generally, but Euploia (Fair Voyage) by the Knidians themselves.

If still in use by the 4th-century, it would have been closed during the persecution of pagans in the late Roman Empire. The sanctuary was discovered in 1969 by Iris C. Love, who excavated the temple in 1970. At the site, Love found the marble base and fragments of the statue of Aphrodite by Praxiteles.

== See also ==
- List of Ancient Greek temples
