= Mesudiye, Datça =

Mesudiye
- Neighbourhood
- Location in Turkey Mesudiye (Turkey Aegean)
- Coordinates: 36.70104°N 27.569937°E
- Country: Turkey
- Province: Muğla
- District: Datça
- Population (2022): 910
- Time zone: UTC+3 (TRT)

Mesudiye is a neighbourhood of the municipality and district of Datça, Muğla Province, Turkey. Its population is 910 (2022). It is located on the Datça Peninsula where the Mediterranean embraces the Aegean Sea.

Mezgit is a part of the Mesudiye village and is home to around 100 families. It is located 200 meters above sea level and has wonderful views over the sea and the Greek island of Tilos. An olive oil mill is located in the center of the village, known as "Mezgit Mengen" by the locals. The mill has been completely renovated and all original details have been preserved. A short video about the olive oil mill is available here
