= Demeter of Knidos =

Ancient Greek statue

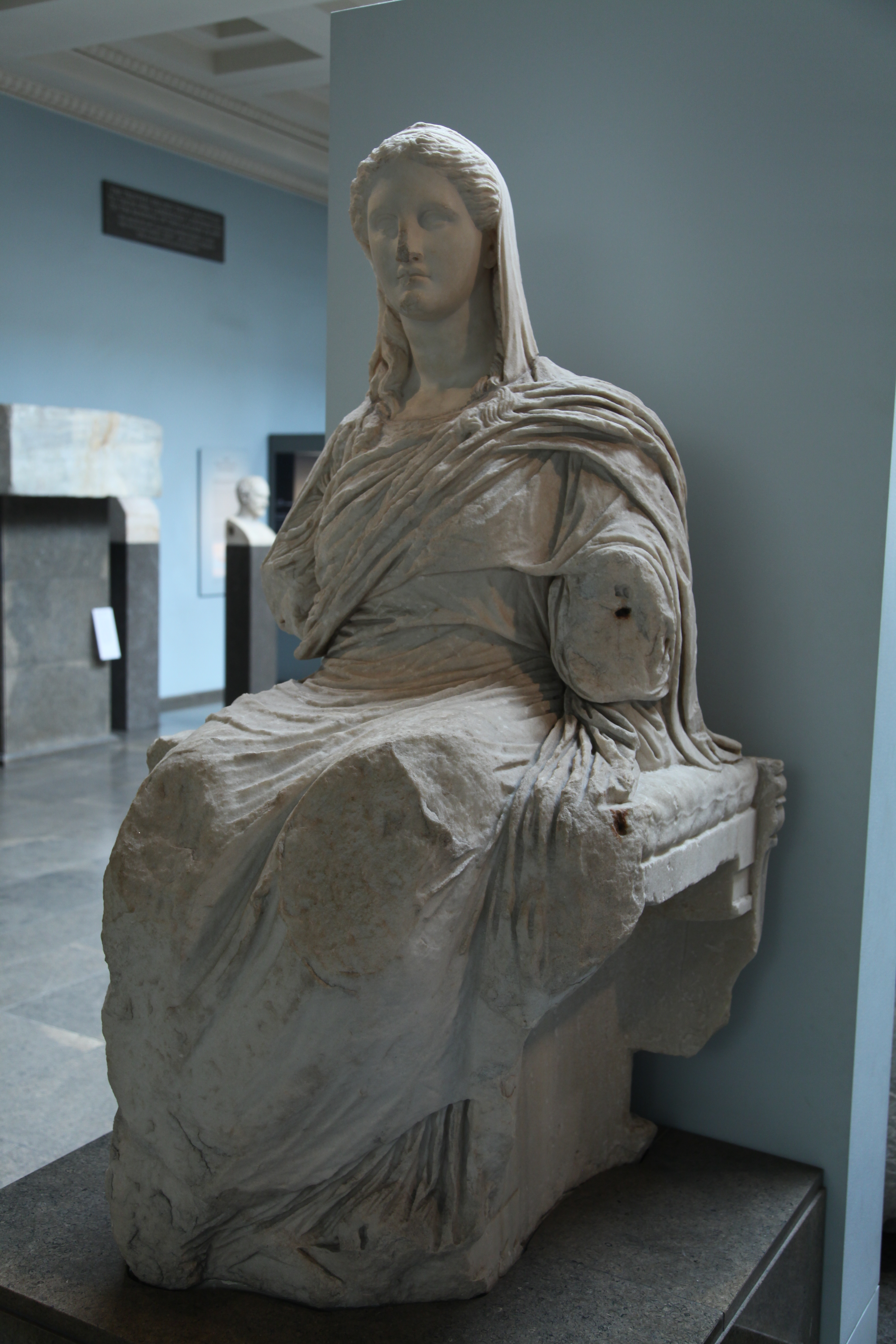
- Demeter of Knidos
- Material: Marble
- Size: 150 cm high
- Created: c. 350 BC
- Present location: British Museum, London
- Registration: 1859.12-26.26

The Demeter of Knidos is a life-size, seated ancient Greek statue that was erected near the ancient port of Knidos, south-west Asia Minor (now near Datça in present-day Turkey). Now part of the British Museum's collection, it is an impressive example of Hellenistic sculpture from around 350 BC.

== Description ==
The statue is made of marble and in its seated position is approximately 150 centimetres (4 ft 11 in) high. The goddess is seated on a throne and while parts of the sculpture are in excellent condition, the back and arm-rails of the throne, as well as her lower arms and hands, separately carved, are missing. The head was also carved independently from the body and fixed onto the neck. Demeter is depicted in a serene, timeless manner, that unveils her motherly role in the Greek pantheon of gods.

== Sanctuary of Demeter ==
Demeter was the goddess of agriculture and of fertility who created the harvest, the grain and other crops as well as the circle of seasons. At Knidos she was worshipped with Hades and the other underworld deities including her mythical daughter Persephone. The Sanctuary of Demeter at Knidos was laid out in 350 BC, when the city was reestablished. The sanctuary consisted of a long terrace built into the side of an acropolis, overlooking the city and seascape below. Many votive sculptures were deposited within the sanctuary. Most of these were discovered by excavators in fragments, but the statue of divine Demeter herself remains relatively intact.

== Excavation and Removal ==
The British archaeologist Sir Charles Thomas Newton excavated The Demeter of Knidos in 1857–58 and almost immediately removed it to London to become part of the British Museum's Ancient Greek and Roman collection.
