= William K. Dickson =

William K. Dickson may refer to:

- William Kennedy Dickson (1860–1935), French-Anglo-Scottish inventor
- William Kirk Dickson (1860–1949), editor of The Jacobite Attempt of 1719 published in 1895
