= Richard Popplewell Pullan =

- Born: 27 March 1825; Knaresborough, Yorkshire
- Died: 30 April 1888 (aged 63); Brighton, Sussex

Richard Popplewell Pullan was an architect and brother-in-law of William Burges. He is known for his work in archaeology including the discovery of the Lion of Knidos.

== Life ==
Pullan was born at Knaresborough on 27 March 1825. He was articled to Richard Lane in Manchester and in 1853 he worked with Sir Matthew Digby Wyatt on the Medieval court at the Great Exhibition. In 1855, he was placed second in the competition for Lille Cathedral, a competition Burges also entered.

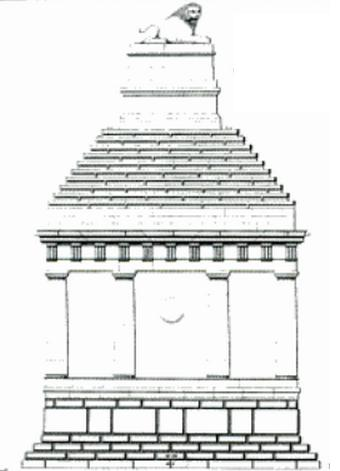
Pullan's sketch of what it would have looked like when it was first built. It is 18 metres high and faced in marble. The lion weighs 6 tons.

The Lion of Knidos was found in 1858 by Pullan as he walked the cliffs near where he was helping Charles Thomas Newton to excavate the ancient Greek city of Knidos. Royal Engineer Robert Murdoch Smith was given the task of assisting. He was presented with the lion statue that had fallen onto its front face. The limestone core of the monument was still there but the marble cladding and other details had either been stolen or lay around where it had fallen. Smith was able to replace and move each of the remaining stones which allowed the engineer to write a detailed report on the structure. Pullan created an orthographic drawing of the building. It is thought to be a good reproduction of what the whole structure would have looked like. The Lion of Knidos was loaded onto the naval ship HMS Supply and shipped to London. It is now in the British Museum.

In 1859 he married William Burges's sister, Mary.

Pullan had an office at 15 Clifford's Inn London and entered many of the major competitions of the later Victorian period, without success. He earned a living by lecturing and authoring, writing a number of books on his travels in the Middle East and on architecture, including Elementary lectures on Christian architecture. On Burges's' death in 1881 the Pullans inherited The Tower House in Kensington, Burges's own home. In the following years, Pullan worked with a number of Burges's team, including John Starling Chapple and William Frame to complete some of Burges's unfinished works, including Cardiff Castle and Castell Coch, the fantasy palaces Burges had begun for John Crichton-Stuart, 3rd Marquess of Bute.

Pullan also authored two studies of Burges's work, The House of W. Burges, A.R.A., in 1886 and Architectural Designs of W. Burges, in 1887.

Pullan died at Brighton on 30 April 1888.
