= Chios (Caria) =

Ancient human settlement

Chios (Ancient Greek: Χίος) was a town of ancient Caria. It was a member of the Delian League since it appears in tribute records of Athens in 454/3, 448/7, and 447/6 BCE, paying a phoros of 2000 drachmae. It is also mentioned in a tribute decree of Athens dated to 425/4 BCE.

Its site is unlocated but on the Datça peninsula.
