= Apollo of Cyrene =

Roman statue

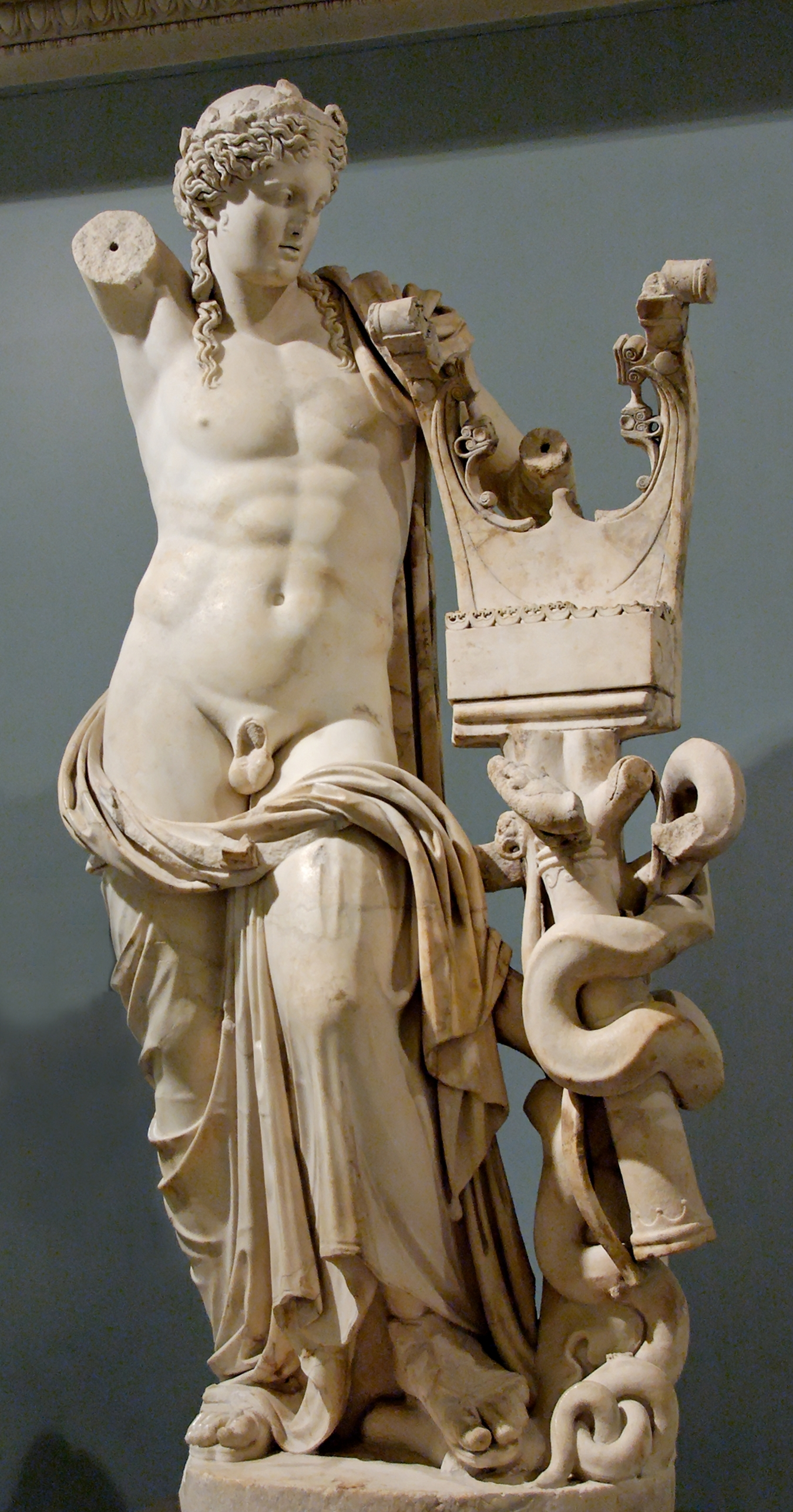
- The Apollo of Cyrene on display in the British Museum
- Material: Marble
- Size: 2.28 m high
- Created: 2nd Century AD/CE
- Discovered: Cyrene, Libya
- Present location: British Museum, London
- Registration: 1861.7-25.1

The Apollo of Cyrene is a large Roman statue of Apollo found at the ancient city of Cyrene, Libya. It was unearthed at the site along with a great number of other ancient sculptures and inscriptions which were presented to the British Museum in 1861.

== Discovery ==
The sculpture was discovered in the mid-nineteenth century at the Temple of Apollo at Cyrene in Libya. It was excavated by the British explorers and amateur archaeologists Captain Robert Murdoch Smith and Commander Edwin A. Porcher. The statue was found broken into 121 pieces, lying near the large plinth where it originally stood. The fragments were later reassembled in the British Museum to create a relatively intact statue of 2.28 m height. Some parts are missing, including the right arm and the left hand.

== Description ==
The statue dates to the 2nd century AD, and is a copy of a Hellenistic work probably dating to between 200 and 150 BC. It is made from high-quality marble and would have originally been painted. The god is shown nude with the exception of a cloak wrapped around his hips. As the god of music, he is shown playing a kithara while a python nestles round a quiver by his left leg. The statue has a curious mixture of masculine and feminine characteristics, which reflects its Hellenistic origin.

== Temple of Apollo ==
The statue was probably the main cult image in the Temple of Apollo at Cyrene. The deity would have acted as the focal point for worship and ritual activity.

== Gallery ==
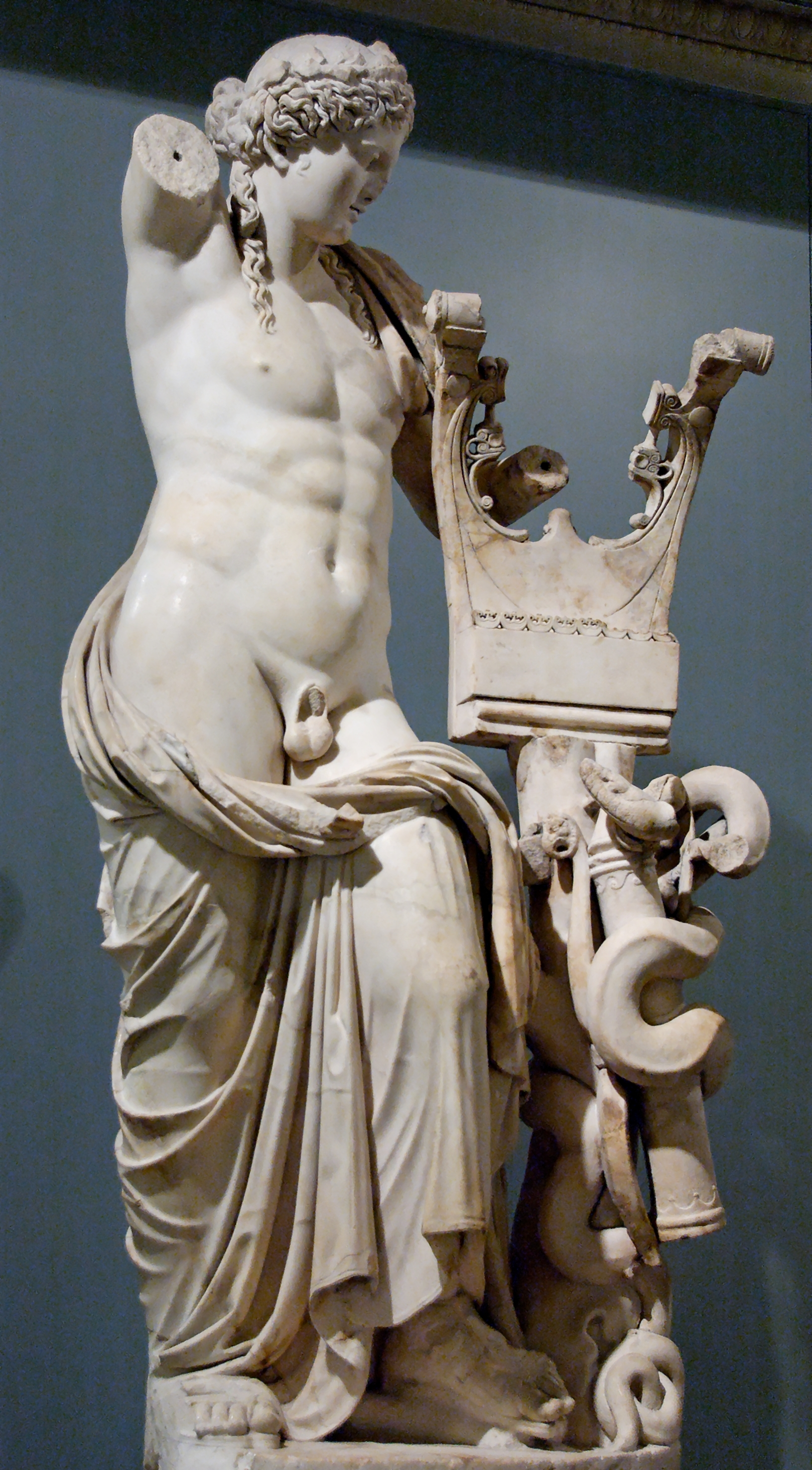
Alternative view of the statue
