= Sostratus of Cnidus =

Ancient Greek architect

Sostratus of Cnidus (/ˈsɒstrətəs/; Ancient Greek: Σώστρατος ὁ Κνίδος; born 3rd century BC) was a Greek architect and engineer. He is said to have designed the lighthouse of Alexandria, one of the Seven Wonders of the Ancient World (c. 280 BC), on the island of Pharos off Alexandria, Egypt. This claim is disputed.

Strabo writes that the lighthouse was dedicated and presumably funded by Sostratus, a friend of Egypt's ruler, Ptolemy. Pliny says that Sostratus was the architect and that Ptolemy graciously allowed him to "sign" the monument.
