= Demiurge (magistrate) =

Magistrate in Ancient Greece

A demiurge was a magistrate in Peloponnesian and other Ancient Greek city-states, including Corinth, Mantinea and Argos, and in their colonies, such as the Doric colony of Cnidus in Asia Minor. The English word for the title is an Anglicisation of Attic-Ionic δημιοργός, but because it was most commonly used by Doric Greek speakers, the original word in Greek has various alternate spellings (see below).

In the Achaean League, the assembly of members was presided over by ten elected demiourgoi; Corinth sent epidemiourgoi annually to Potidaea to report to the Spartan harmosts. The term is variously rendered δαιμουργός (daimourgos), δαιμωργός (daimorgos), and δαμιεργός (damiergos) in Doric Greek, and δημιοργός (demiorgos) in Ionic Greek on the island of Samos.

In the Archaic Argolid, the demiurge seems to have served as a judge, and when one was lacking, his role could be fulfilled by a hieromneme, according to an inscription from Mycenae recorded in the Inscriptiones Graecae IV, 493.

Another group of magistrates at Argos, the artynai or artynoi are mentioned once by Thucydides, and once in a fifth-century BC inscription referring to "joint-artynoi" at Argos. The demiurges are mentioned in three inscriptions dating to the early through mid-sixth century BC; there is also a much later board of demiurges attested for Hellenistic Mycenae. Because of the relative paucity of sources for Argive government, it is difficult to tell if the Argive demiurges shared power with the artynai mentioned in Thucydides, or if that word encompassed both the demiurges and other public officers such as the tamias (treasurer).
