= William Kirk Dickson =

Scottish advocate and librarian

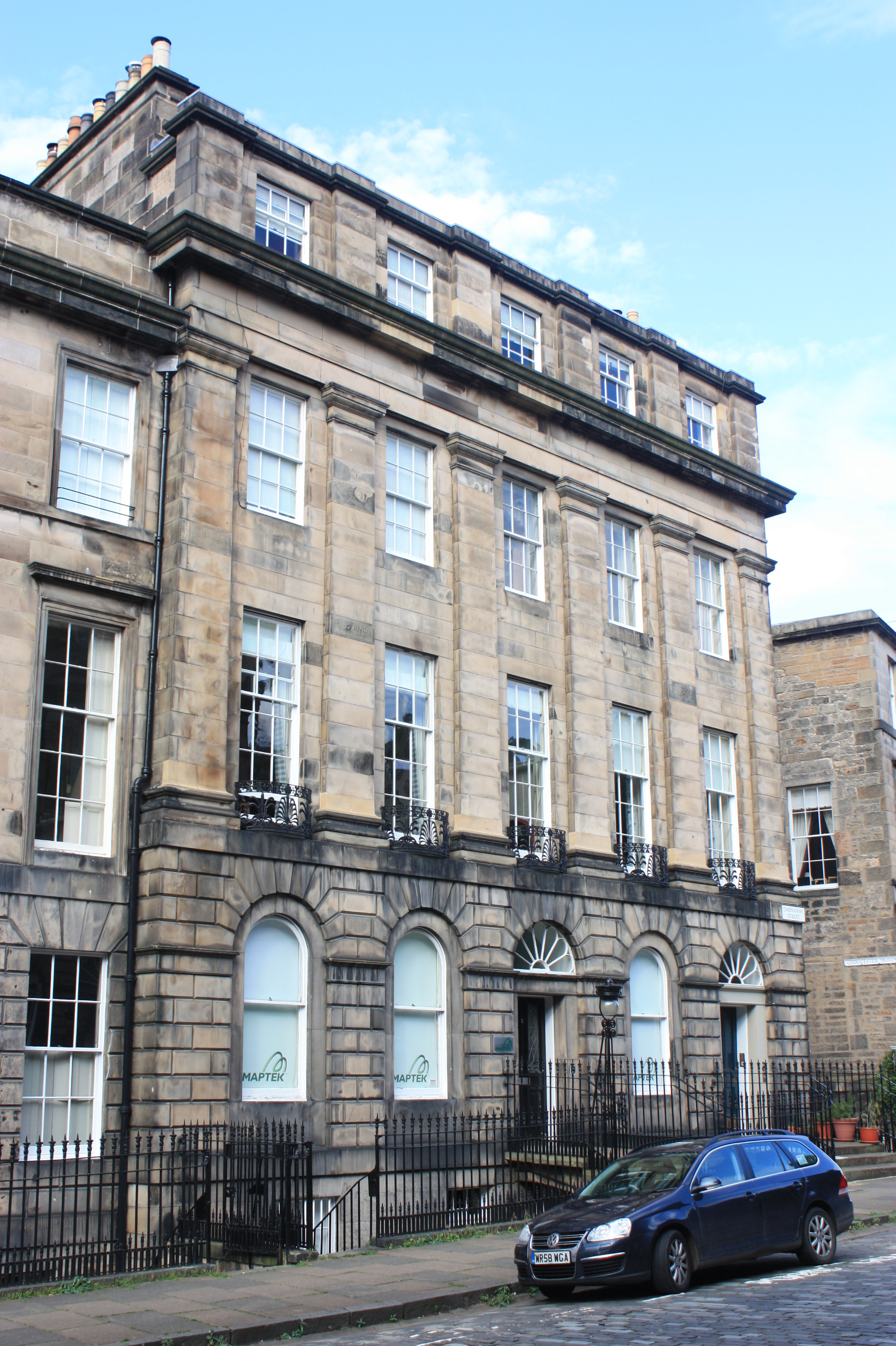
1 and 3 Darnaway Street, Edinburgh

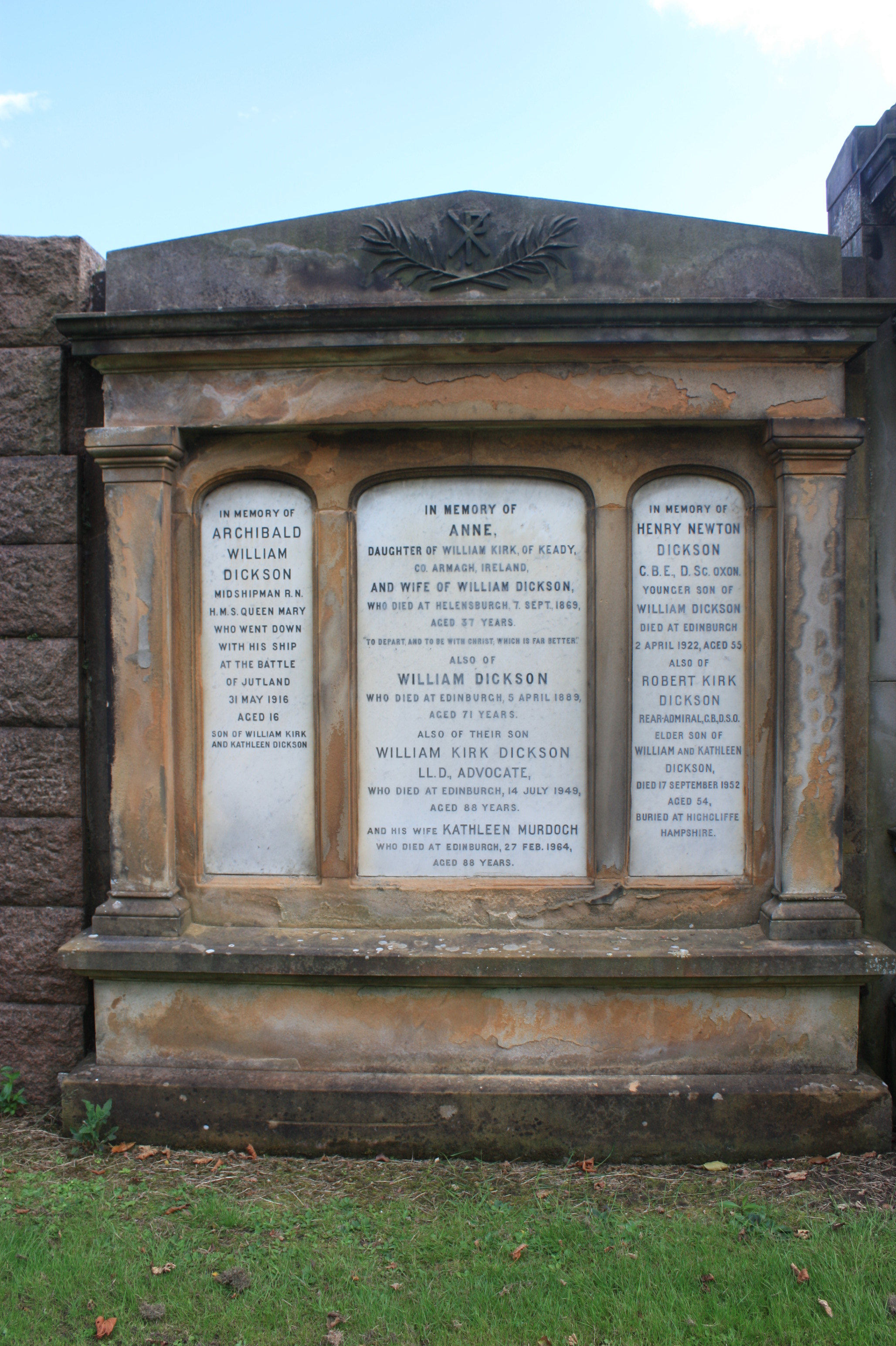
The grave of William Kirk Dickson, Grange Cemetery, Edinburgh

William Kirk Dickson (1860 – 14 July 1949) was a Scottish advocate, librarian and writer. He was Keeper of the Advocates' Library from 1906 to 1925, and Librarian of the National Library of Scotland from 1925 to 1931.

== Life ==
He was born in Edinburgh, the son of William Dickson of Mauricewood (near Glencorse) and his wife, Anne Kirk.

He studied law at University of Edinburgh and qualified as an advocate in 1887.

In 1890 he was living and working at 38 York Place.

In the late 19th century he lived at 3 Darnaway Street on the Moray Estate in western Edinburgh.

In 1912 University of St Andrews granted him an honorary doctorate, LL.D. Some of the most significant works that he wrote or edited include:

- 1895: Editor of "The Jacobite Attempt of 1719: Letters of James Butler, Second Duke of Ormonde"
- 1899: "A Narrative of the Highland Campaigns" in: Historical Geography of the Clans of Scotland
- 1901: "The Life of Major-General Sir Robert Murdoch Smith, K.C.M.G., Royal Engineers" (his father-in-law)
- 1904: Editor of "The surrender of Napoleon"

He died in Edinburgh on 14 July 1949 and is buried with his parents in the Grange Cemetery in the south of the city. The grave lies against the south wall. His wife Kathleen Murdoch, daughter of Major General Sir Robert Murdoch-Smith lies with him. His son Rear Admiral Robert Kirk Dickson (1898–1952) is buried at St Mark's Church, Highcliffe, Dorset.

His youngest son, Archibald William Dickson, was killed in the Battle of Jutland, when HMS Queen Mary was destroyed by SMS Derfflinger, aged 16.
