= Iris Love =

American archaeologist (1933–2020)

- Born: August 1, 1933; New York City, New York, U.S.
- Died: April 17, 2020 (aged 86); New York City, New York, U.S.
- Education: Smith College (BA); Hunter College (attended); New York University (MA)
- Partner: Liz Smith (separated)
- Family: Guggenheim family (maternal side)

Iris Cornelia Love (August 1, 1933 – April 17, 2020) was an American classical archaeologist, best known for the rediscovery of the Temple of Aphrodite in Knidos.

== Early life and education ==
Love was born and raised on 713 Park Avenue in Lenox Hill, Manhattan to Cornelius Love, a diplomat and investment banker descended from Alexander Hamilton and from Captain Cook, and Audrey Josephthal, a great-granddaughter of Meyer Guggenheim. Her parents collected art and antiques, her British governess was a classicist, and she was interested from an early age in archaeology and languages. Her grandmother, Edyth Guggenheim Josephthal, left her a trust fund.

She was educated at the Brearley School in New York and the Madeira School in McLean, Virginia, and in 1955, she graduated with a Bachelor of Arts from Smith College.

She later studied Greek at Hunter College, earned a master's degree in classical archaeology from the New York University Institute of Fine Arts and completed coursework for her doctorate, but never wrote her dissertation, concentrating on her archaeological investigations.

While at Smith, Love spent her junior year abroad at the University of Florence and then wrote her senior thesis on the Etruscan warrior figures at the Metropolitan Museum of Art, which she identified as fakes on the basis of comparison with figures at the National Archaeological Museum in Florence. In 1960, she met with the Director of the Metropolitan, James Rorimer, a family friend, to advise him of her forthcoming paper in a New York University journal exposing the figures as not genuine, but the museum announced the forgeries to The New York Times the day before its publication, without acknowledging her research. Alfredo Fioravanti confirmed that he had created the Metropolitan's figures.

== Career ==
Love's first excavation was on the island of Samothrace, under Phyllis Williams Lehmann, beginning in 1955. She taught at Cooper Union, at Smith, and at C.W. Post Long Island University, where she became research assistant professor of art history and archeology in 1967.

After first visiting Knidos with Turkish archaeologist Aşkıdil Akarca, she conducted annual excavations there from 1967, with funding from New York University assisted by wealthy family friends and foundations. In 1969, her mostly female team discovered a foundation that Love believed to be the remains of the Temple of Aphrodite; this was confirmed by inscriptions found the following year. After Love presented her results at the annual meeting of the Archaeological Institute of America, it excited international attention and visits to the excavation site by many famous guests, including Mick and Bianca Jagger. This fanfare called Love's interpretation into question, with critics accusing her of converting the excavation into a vacation destination.

The finds at the temple site in Knidos included fragments of over-lifesized hands that Love believed to be from the statue of Aphrodite by the Athenian artist Praxiteles. In November 1970, she announced that she believed she had found the statue's head in a storeroom at the British Museum. The museum strongly disagreed, stirring a dispute in the press. Love later concentrated on the search for fragments of the statue at Knidos, digging numerous deep search trenches that still shape the area of ancient Knidos.

Love's discoveries in Knidos also included a Minoan settlement, in 1977; she later turned to Magna Graecia, primarily looking for other shrines of Aphrodite along the Gulf of Naples, but in 1986, after the Achille Lauro incident, the Italian government restricted civilian access to the Monte di Dio, where she had planned to dig for the Temple of Aphrodite at Parthenope. In 1982 she rediscovered a temple of Aphrodite in Ancona, at the northernmost point of Greek settlement in Italy.

== Later life and death ==
After retiring from archaeology, Love bred dogs, initially dachshunds, at a house she owned in Vermont; Malachy, a pekingese whom she co-owned, won Best of Show at the 2012 Westminster Kennel Club Dog Show, and she was also part-owner of Wasabi, a grandson of Malachy who was the 2021 winner. She lived romantically for 15 years with journalist Liz Smith, dividing her time between New York and Italy, where she also had a relationship with designer and artist Bice Brichetto.

She died on April 17, 2020, at New York-Presbyterian/Weill Cornell Medical Center of COVID-19.

== Honors ==
Love was voted one of the "ten legendary women of the world" in 1980 for her archaeological career, received an honorary doctorate in fine arts from Marymount Manhattan College, and she was the first American to be made a Fellow of the Institute of the History and Archaeology of the Magna Grecia in Naples.
