= Robert Murdoch Smith =

Scottish engineer, archaeologist and diplomat

Major General Sir Robert Murdoch Smith KCMG FRSE
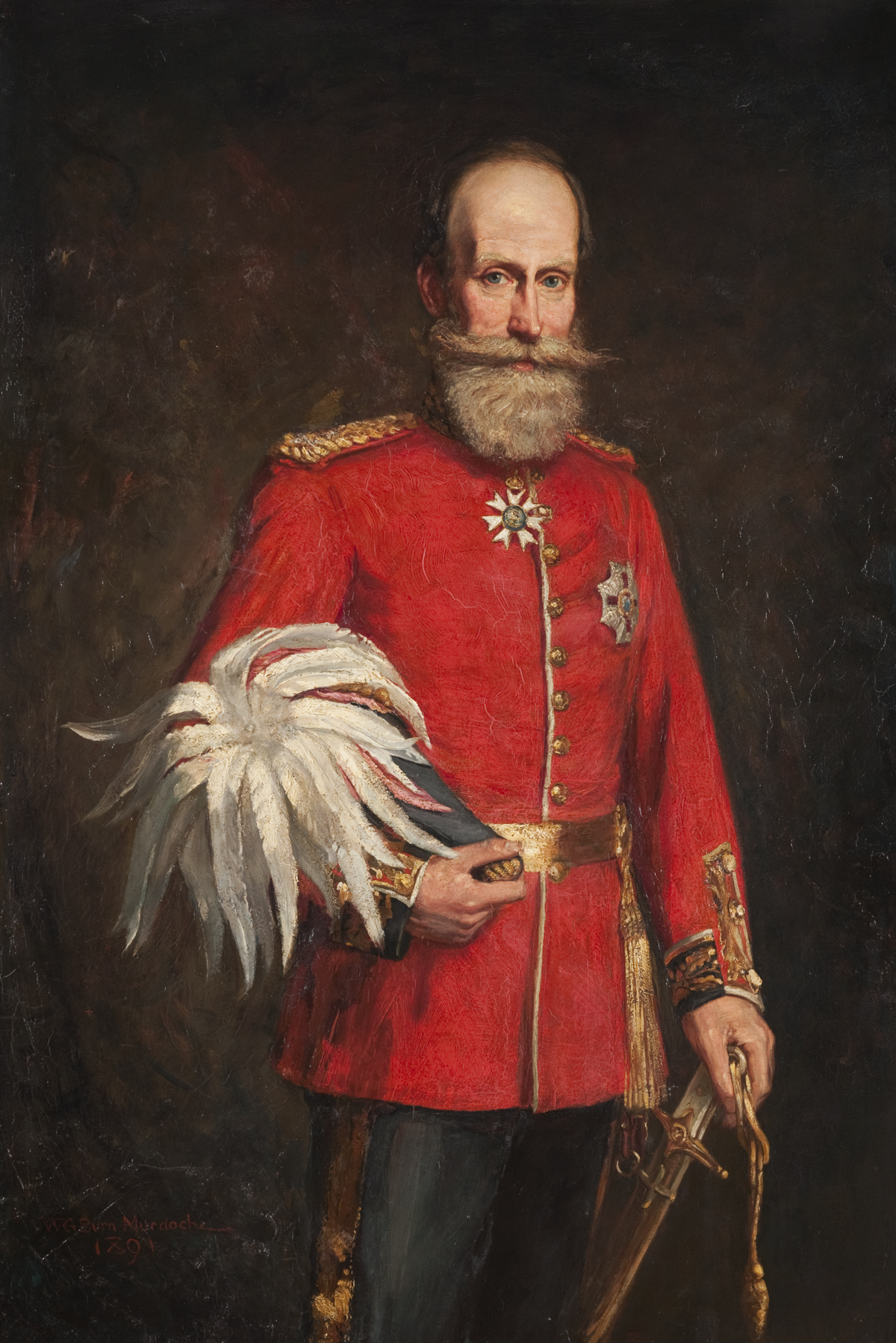
- 1891 portrait of Smith by William Gordon Burn-Murdoch
- Born: 18 August 1835; Kilmarnock, Scotland
- Died: 3 July 1900 (aged 64); Edinburgh, Scotland

Major General Sir Robert Murdoch Smith KCMG FRSE (18 August 1835 – 3 July 1900) was a Scottish engineer, archaeologist and diplomat. He is known for his involvement with the excavation of antiquities found at Knidos and Cyrene, the telegraph to Iran, Persian antiquities bought for the Victoria and Albert Museum, and for serving as Director of the Edinburgh Museum of Science and Art.

== Early life ==
Smith was born on 18 August 1835 in Bank Street, Kilmarnock. He was the second child of Jean (born Murdoch) and Dr Hugh Smith. He attended Kilmarnock Academy and went on to spend four years at Glasgow University. He found moral philosophy vague, but excelled at science, in which his lecturers included the young Lord Kelvin.

Smith joined the British Army (Royal Engineers) during the Crimean War and out of the 380 candidates who took the entry exam he came first. In September 1855, Smith was gazetted to Lieutenant and in the following October was chosen to lead a small group of Royal Engineers bound to help Charles Thomas Newton's archaeological mission to the remains of the ancient civilisation at Knidos in Turkey.

== Archaeology ==
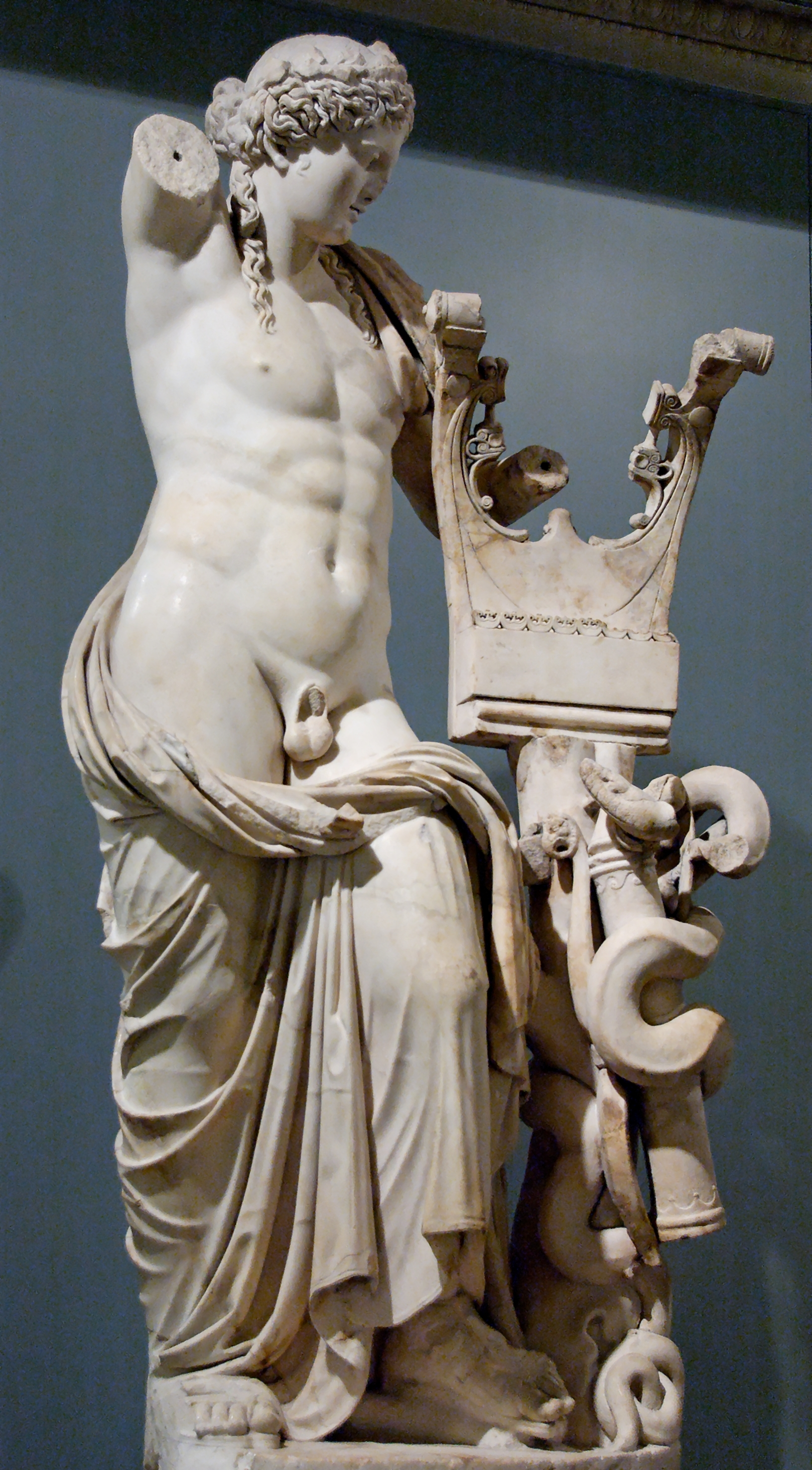
The Apollo of Cyrene was found in 121 pieces by Smith. It is 2.29 metres tall.

The Lion of Knidos was found in 1858 by the architect Richard Popplewell Pullan near where he was helping Newton's Knidos excavations. Smith's role was significant as he was presented with a large statue that had fallen onto its front face on a high cliff and it was Smith who discovered the location of the mausoleum. The limestone core of a monument was still there but the marble had been moved or stolen. Other pieces of worked stone lay around where they had been abandoned. Smith was able to replace, examine and move each of the remaining stones, and to create a detailed report on the supposed construction and its historical context. This allowed Pullen to sketch what is thought to be a good reproduction of what the whole mausoleum would have looked like. The Lion of Knidos was loaded onto the naval ship HMS Supply and shipped to London, where it is now held in the British Museum.

Smith was very interested in archaeology and he decided to fund another two-year expedition to excavate the lost settlements of Cyrenaica in North Africa. The British government had permitted this expedition and when Smith and Lieutenant E. A. Porcher returned they deposited a large quantity of Cyrene sculptures and artefacts in the British Museum. This included the 2.29-metre (7 ft 6 in) high Apollo of Cyrene which they found in 121 pieces. They moved the pieces away secretly, fearing the marble fragments would be further destroyed by the locals because the sculpture was non-Islamic. In 1862, Smith was able to publish his account of the excavations at Knidos, and in 1864 he wrote and Porcher illustrated their report on the Cyrene work.

== Iran ==
From 1865 Smith was a director of the Persian Telegraph Company, which enabled him to drastically improve the local infrastructure. He obtained this appointment following two years he spent assisting with the difficult task of installing the 1,200-mile-long wire required to join Tehran to London. Smith noted that this was done under difficult conditions as the locals saw it as a tool of the colonists.

In parallel with this he had not lost his interest in culture. In 1873, he was given the unusual task of gathering artefacts and antiquities for the United Kingdom paid for by the Department of Science and Art. Smith did not just buy individual items, but in at least one case bought an entire collection belonging to Jules Richard in 1875. Richard was known as Rišār Khan and had initially worked as a translator, but he was involved in a variety of tasks from photography to balloon manufacture for the Shah.

He lived in Tehran and his collection was so extensive that a special exhibition was staged in 1876 with a guide to the Victoria and Albert Museum's special gallery written by Smith. The V&A acknowledge that it is Smith's acquisitions that formed their Iranian collection. Smith had not ignored his main job and his partnership with the Shah, Nasir al-Din, was noted when he received his Sword of Honour.

== Later life ==
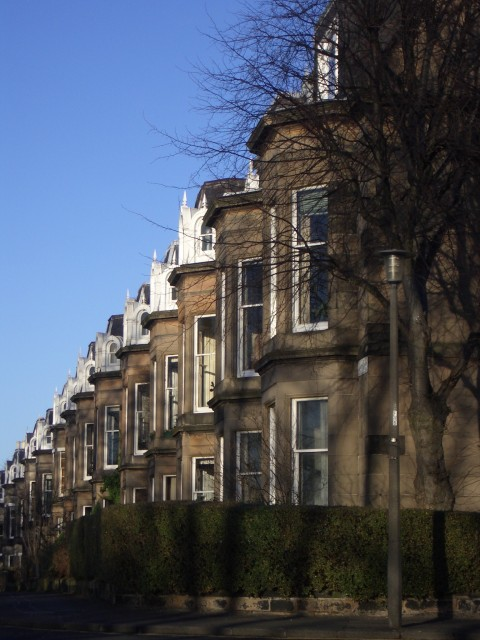
Magdala Crescent

The relatively new Edinburgh Museum of Science and Art appointed him as its director in 1885 and he was made Knight Commander of the Order of St Michael and St George (KCMG) three years later, following a successful diplomatic mission to renegotiate Persian telegraph contracts. He gained a significant extension to the contracts, and as a gesture of good-will, received a diamond-covered snuff-box from the Shah.

His wife, Eleanor Katherine Baker (whom he married in 1869) died in 1883. In 1886 he was elected a Fellow of the Royal Society of Edinburgh. His proposers were William Thomson, Lord Kelvin, Robert James Blair Cunynghame, Alexander Crum Brown and John Chiene.

He died at home, 17 Magdala Crescent in Edinburgh in 1900, leaving two daughters.
