= Stadia (Caria) =

Ancient city in Caria

Coordinates: 36°44′32″N 27°38′54″E

Stadia (Ancient Greek: Στάδια) was a town of ancient Caria. It became a bishopric; no longer the seat of a residential bishop, it remains a titular see of the Roman Catholic Church.

Its site is located near Datça, Asiatic Turkey.
