= Datça Peninsula =

Peninsula in Turkey

Coordinates: 36°42′26.52″N 27°33′07.10″E

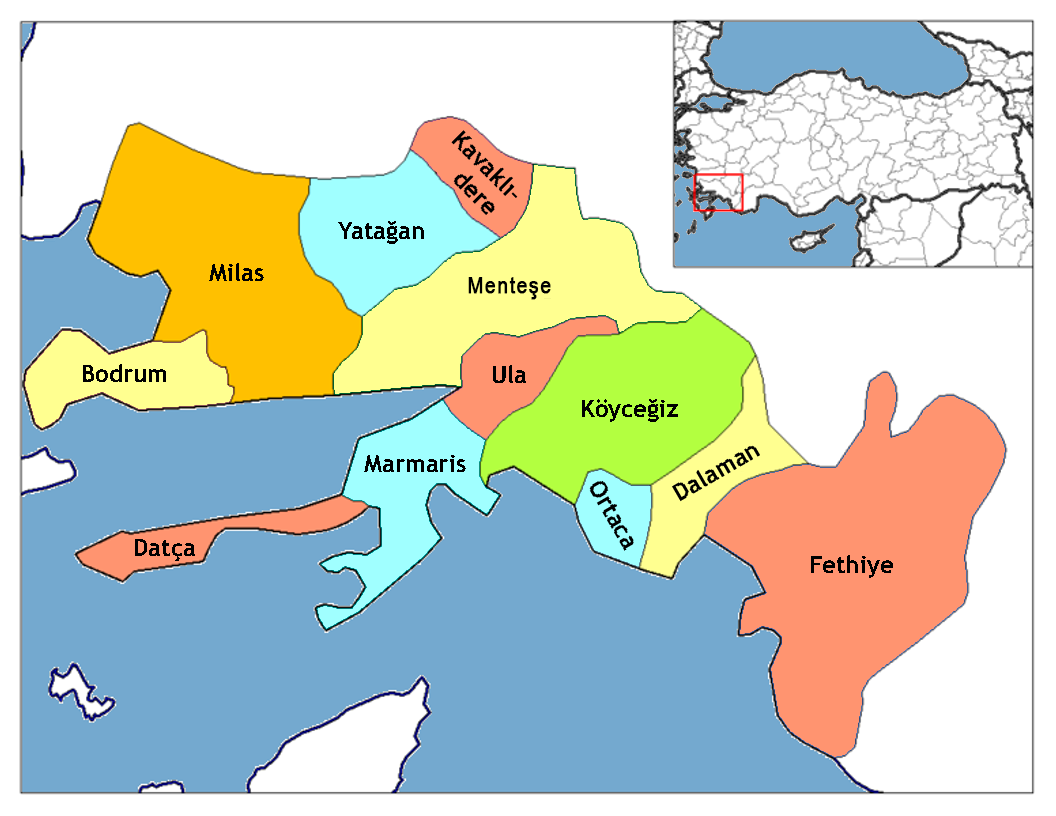
Map of province including Datça Peninsula

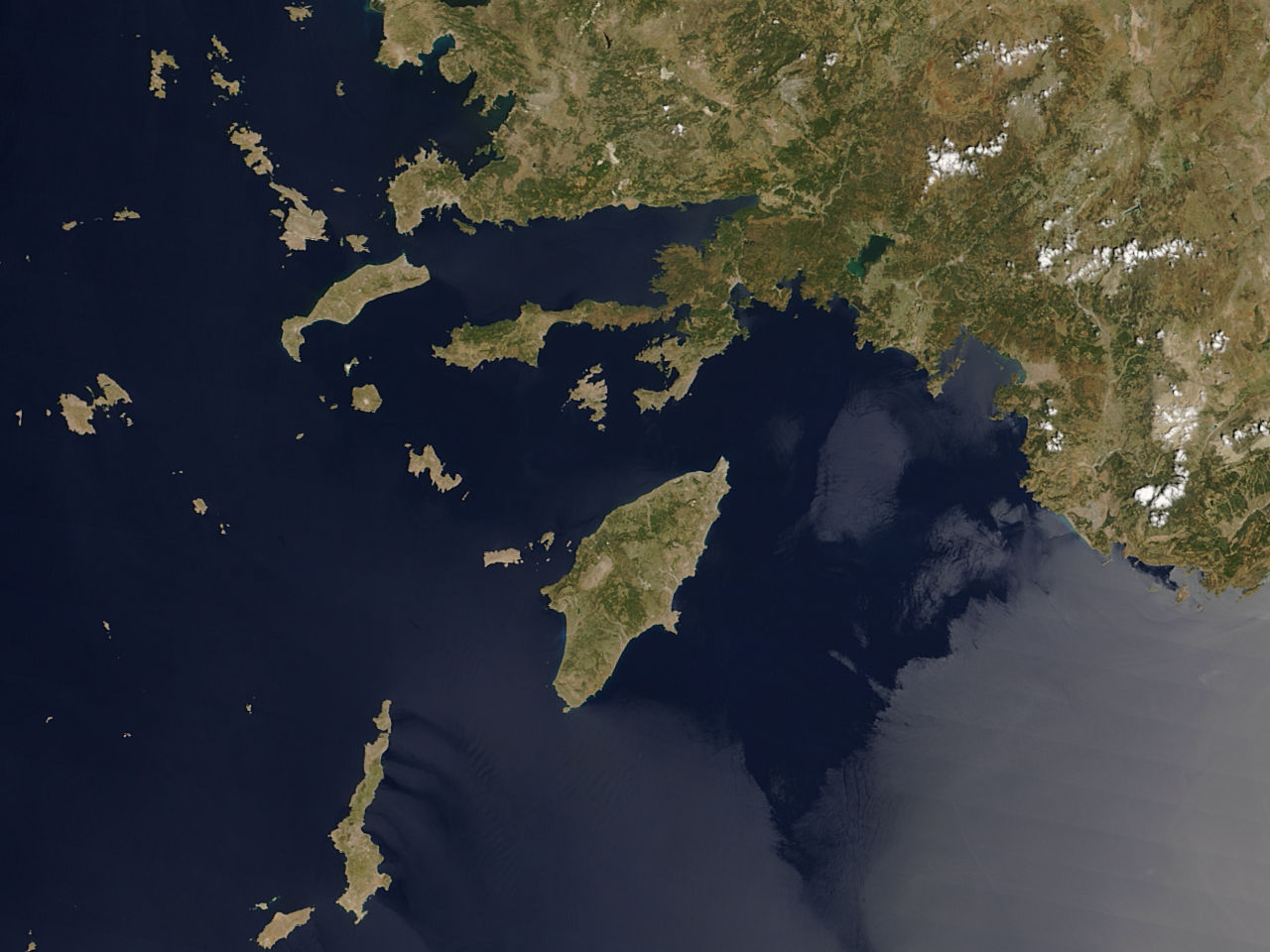
Satellite image from NASA Visible Earth

The Datça Peninsula, also known as the Reşadiye Peninsula, is an 80 km-long, narrow peninsula in southwest Turkey separating the Gulf of Gökova to the north from the Hisarönü to the south. The peninsula corresponds almost exactly to the administrative district of Datça, part of Muğla Province. The town of Datça is located at its halfway point.

Previously, the ancient Greek names for the peninsula included the Dorian or Cnidos Peninsula or the Chersonisos Cnidia.

== Main features ==
The eastern half of the peninsula is bare, mountainous, and scarcely inhabited. In the middle of the peninsula, centered around the town of Datça, is the peninsula's largest area of good land, extending towards the southwest of its median isthmus dividing the two halves of the land mass. The western part is also mountainous, rising in places over 1,000 meters, but has towards its western end on the south side a considerable extent of well-watered land reaching to the coast at Palamutbükü locality and supporting a group of villages known collectively as Betçe (the five villages).

At the tip of the peninsula in its extreme west is the locality called Tekir, marked by Cape Deveboynu, formerly Cape Crio/Kriyo. The cape is a small peninsula nearly an island, connected to the mainland by a low, 100m-wide spit of land; in antiquity, it was a man-made causeway. The island's ancient name was Triopion, after Triopas, the legendary founder of Knidos.

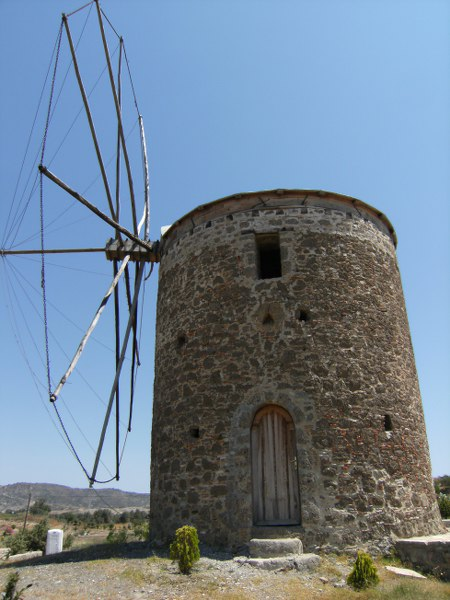
Datça's traditional windmills are advantaged by the peninsula's strong winds

The peninsula's eastern end is Bencik Cove, about 1.5 km in length and sometimes referred to as a fjord on the basis of local scales, and at the end of its indentation is the narrow isthmus where Datça Peninsula joins the Anatolian mainland is found. This point is a natural curiosity which offers a wide view of the two gulfs in the north and the south. The locality is called Balıkaşıran (literally, the place where fish may leap across) and is also often used for the portage of small boats.

The north coast is low, with vast beaches swept by the meltem winds in the summer. The south coast is dramatically rocky and indented. Because of the many natural bays and harbors, the peninsula is often visited by private yachts, and is included in the boat tours usually departing from Bodrum or Marmaris and termed Blue Cruises.

There are ruins of Greek cities both at Datça and Tekir, one or both of which may correspond to ancient Knidos (q.v.).

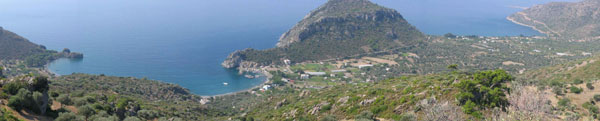
Datça Peninsula is traced by many small bays

== Names ==
It was called the Dorian Peninsula or simply Doris because it was settled by Dorian colonists from the Peloponnese, cf. Dorian Hexapolis.

The name Datça comes from Stadia, an ancient town. Stadia developed into Tadya, Dadya, Dadça, and then Datça.

Both the town and the peninsula of Datça were called Reşadiye for a brief period in the beginning of the 20th century, honoring the penultimate Ottoman Sultan Mehmed V Reşad, and some maps may still refer to the peninsula under this name; today Reşadiye is the name of one of the quarters of the town.

== See also ==
- Gulf of Gökova (to the north)
- Gulf of Hisarönü (to the south)
