= Charles Thomas Newton =

British archaeologist (1816–1894)

Sir Charles Newton
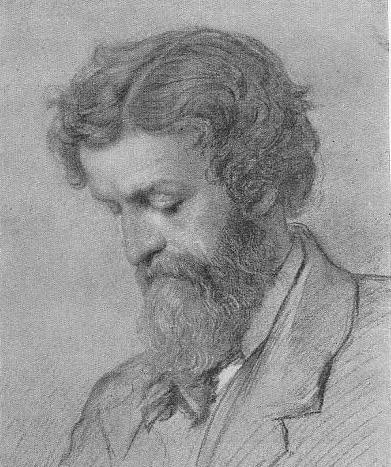
- Sir Charles Newton
- Born: Charles Thomas Newton; 16 September 1816; Clungunford, Shropshire, England
- Died: 28 November 1894 (aged 78); Margate, Kent, England
- Education: Christ Church, Oxford (B.A. 1837; M.A. 1840)
- Scientific career
- Fields: Archaeology
- Workplaces: British Museum

Sir Charles Thomas Newton KCB (16 September 1816 – 28 November 1894) was a British archaeologist. He was made KCB in 1887.

== Life ==
He was born in 1816, the second son of Newton Dickinson Hand Newton, vicar of Clungunford, Shropshire, and afterwards of Bredwardine, Herefordshire.

He was educated at Shrewsbury School (then under Samuel Butler), and at Christ Church, Oxford (matriculating 17 Oct. 1833), where he graduated B.A. in 1837 and M.A. in 1840.

Already in his undergraduate days Newton (as his friend and contemporary, John Ruskin, tells in Præterita) was giving evidence of his natural bent; the scientific study of classical archaeology, which Winckelmann had set on foot in Germany, was in England to find its worthy apostle in Newton. In 1840, contrary to the wishes of his family, he entered the British Museum as an assistant in the department of antiquities. As a career the museum, as it then was, can have presented but few attractions to a young man; but the department, as yet undivided, probably offered to Newton a wider range of comparative study in his subject than he could otherwise have acquired.

In 1852, he was named vice-consul at Mytilene, and from April 1853 to January 1854 he was consul at Rhodes, with the definite duty, among others, of watching over the interests of the British Museum in the Levant. In 1854 and 1855, with funds advanced by Lord Stratford de Redcliffe, he carried on excavations in Kalymnos, enriching the British Museum with an important series of inscriptions, and in the following year he was at length enabled to undertake his long-cherished scheme of identifying the site, and recovering for this country the chief remains, of the mausoleum at Halicarnassus.

In 1856–1857, he achieved the great archaeological exploit of his life by the discovery of the remains of the mausoleum, one of the seven wonders of the ancient world. He was greatly assisted by Murdoch Smith, afterwards celebrated in connection with Persian telegraphs. The results were described by Newton in his History of Discoveries at Halicarnassus (1862–1863), written in conjunction with R. P. Pullan, and in his Travels and Discoveries in the Levant (1865). These works included particulars of other important discoveries, especially at Branchidae, where he disinterred the statues which had anciently lined the Sacred Way, and at Cnidos, where Pullan, acting under his direction, found the Lion of Knidos now in the British Museum. In 1860, he was named consul at Rome, but was the following year recalled to take up the newly created post of keeper of Greek and Roman antiquities at the British Museum.

Newton's keepership at the museum was marked by an amassing wealth of important acquisitions, which were largely attributable to his personal influence or initiation. Thus in the ten years 1864-74 alone he was enabled to purchase no less than five important collections of classical antiquities: the Farnese, the two great series of Castellani, the Pourtales, and the Blacas collections, representing in special grants upwards of £100,000. Meanwhile, his work in the Levant, bringing to the museum the direct results of exploration and research, was being continued by his successors and friends: Biliotti in Rhodes, Smith and Porcher at Gyrene, Lang in Cyprus, Dennis in Sicily, in the Cyrenaica, and around Smyrna, Pullan at Priene, John Turtle Wood at Ephesus were all working more or less directly under Newton on behalf of the museum.

Of his own work as a scholar in elucidating and editing the remains of antiquity, the list of his writings given below is only a slight indication; nor was this confined to writing alone. In 1855, he had been offered by Lord Palmerston (acting on Liddell's advice) the regius professorship of Greek at Oxford, rendered vacant by Dean Gaisford's death, with the definite object of creating a school of students in what was then a practically untried field of classical study at Oxford. The salary, however, was only nominal, and Newton was obliged to decline the post, which was then offered to and accepted by Benjamin Jowett. In 1880, however, the Yates chair of classical archaeology was created at University College, London, and by a special arrangement, Newton was enabled to hold it coincidentally with his museum appointment. As antiquary to the Royal Academy he lectured frequently. In the latter part of his career, he was closely associated with the work of three English societies, all of which owed to him more or less directly their inception and a large part of their success; the Society for the Promotion of Hellenic Studies, at the inaugural meeting of which he presided in June 1879; the British School at Athens, started in February 1885: and the Egypt Exploration Fund, which was founded in 1882.

In 1889, he was presented by his friends and pupils, under the presidency of the Earl of Carnarvon, with a testimonial in the form of a marble portrait bust of himself by Boehm, now deposited in the Mausoleum Room at the British Museum; the balance of the fund was by his own wish devoted to founding a studentship in connection with the British School at Athens. In 1885, he resigned the museum and academy appointments, and in 1888 he was compelled by increasing infirmity to give up the Yates professorship.

On 28 November 1894 he died at Margate, where he had moved from his residence, 2 Montague Place, Bedford Square. He is buried in Kensal Green Cemetery in London.

== Awards ==
In 1874 Newton was made honorary fellow of Worcester College, Oxford, and on 9 June 1875 D.C.L. of the same university; LL.D. of Cambridge, and PhD of Strasburg in 1879; Companion of the Bath (C.B.) on 16 November 1875, and Knight Commander of the same order (K.C.B.) on 21 June 1887. He was correspondent of the Institute of France, honorary director of the Archaeological Institute of Berlin, and honorary member of the Accademia dei Lincei of Rome.

== Family ==
On 27 April 1861, he married the distinguished painter, Ann Mary, daughter of Joseph Severn, himself a painter and the friend of John Keats, who had succeeded Newton in Rome; she died in 1866 at their residence, 74 Gower Street, Bloomsbury.

== Works ==
He was editor of the Collection of Ancient Greek Inscriptions in the British Museum (1874 &c. fol.), and author of numerous other official publications of the British Museum; also of a treatise on the Method of the Study of Ancient Art, 1850; a History of Discoveries at Halicarnassus, Cnidus, and Branchidse, 1862-3; Travels and Discoveries in the Levant, 1865; Essays on Art and Archæology, 1880; and of many papers in periodicals, among which may be specially noted a Memoir on the Mausoleum in the Classical Museum for 1847.

== Sources ==
- Charles T. Newton, History of Discoveries at Halicarnassus(1863) Vol. II
- Charles T. Newton, Travels & Discoveries in the Levant (1865) Vol. II (reissued by Cambridge University Press, 2010. ISBN 978-1-108-01744-2)
- Charles T Newton, Essays on Art and Archaeology (1886) Macmillan, London. (reissued by Cambridge University Press, 2010. ISBN 978-1-108-01741-1)
