= Knidos =

Ancient Greek peninsular city of Caria, Turkey

- Κνίδος (Ancient Greek)
- Cnidus
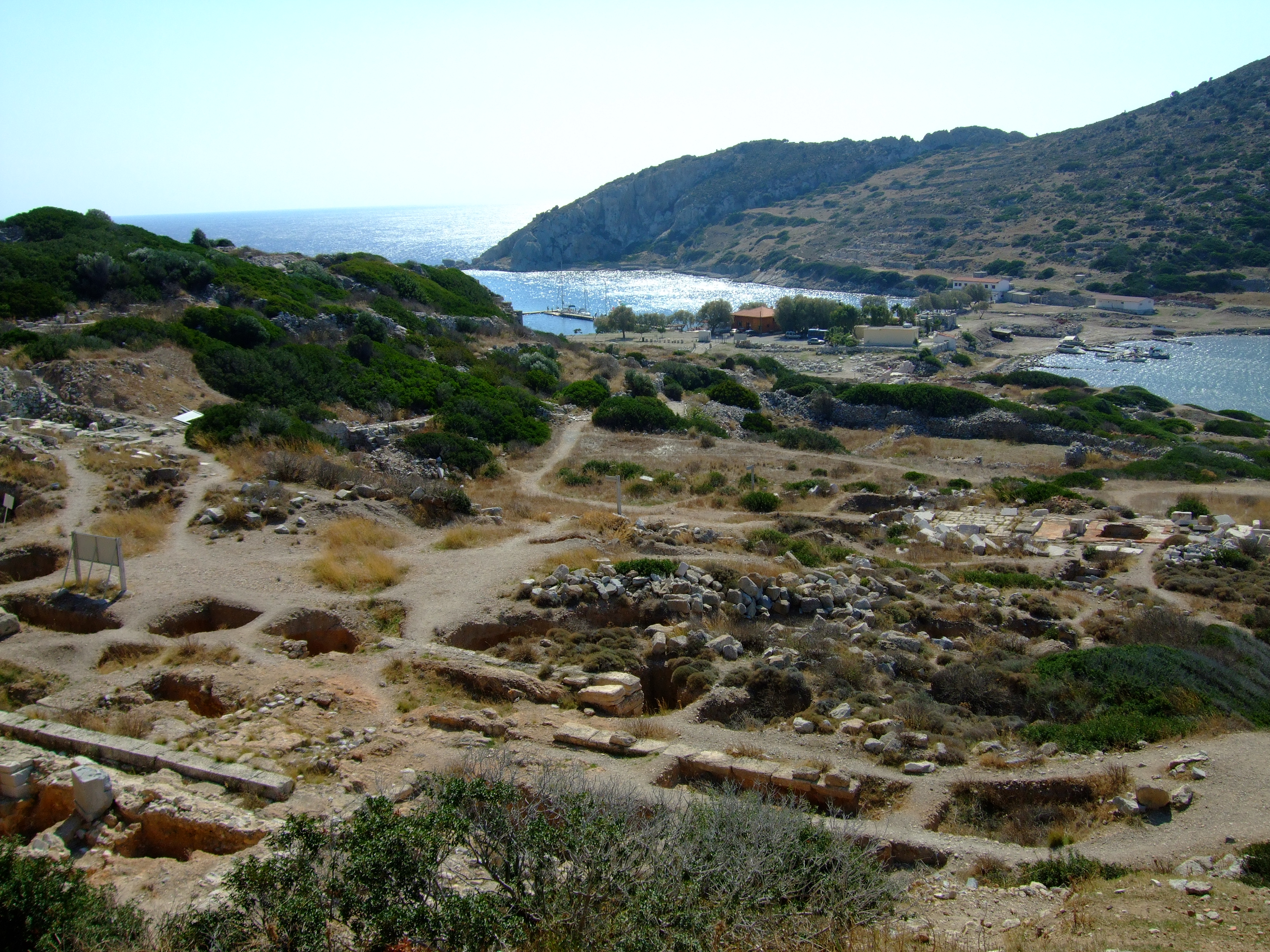
- The port of Knidos

- Location within Turkey
- 36°41′09″N 27°22′30″E
- Associated with: Eudoxus, Ctesias, Sostratus
- Location: Yazıköy, Muğla Province, Turkey
- Region: Caria

History
- Event: Battle of Cnidus

Site notes
- Excavation dates: 1857–1858
- Archaeologists: Charles Thomas Newton
- Public access: Yes

Knidos or Cnidus (/ˈnaɪdəs/; Ancient Greek: Κνίδος, Ancient: [knídos], Modern: [ˈkniðos], Knídos) was a Greek city in ancient Caria and part of the Dorian Hexapolis, in south-western Asia Minor, modern-day Turkey. It was situated on the Datça peninsula, which forms the southern side of the Sinus Ceramicus, now known as Gulf of Gökova. By the 4th century BC, Knidos was located at the site of modern Tekir, opposite Triopion Island. But earlier, it was probably at the site of modern Datça (at the half-way point of the peninsula).

It was built partly on the mainland and partly on the Island of Triopion or Cape Krio. The debate about it being an island or cape is caused by the fact that in ancient times it was connected to the mainland by a causeway and bridge. Today the connection is formed by a narrow sandy isthmus. By means of the causeway the channel between island and mainland was formed into two harbours, of which the larger, or southern, was further enclosed by two strongly built moles that are still in good part entire.

The extreme length of the city was little less than a mile, and the whole intramural area is still thickly strewn with architectural remains. The walls, both of the island and on the mainland, can be traced throughout their whole circuit; and in many places, especially round the acropolis, at the northeast corner of the city, they are remarkably perfect.

== History ==
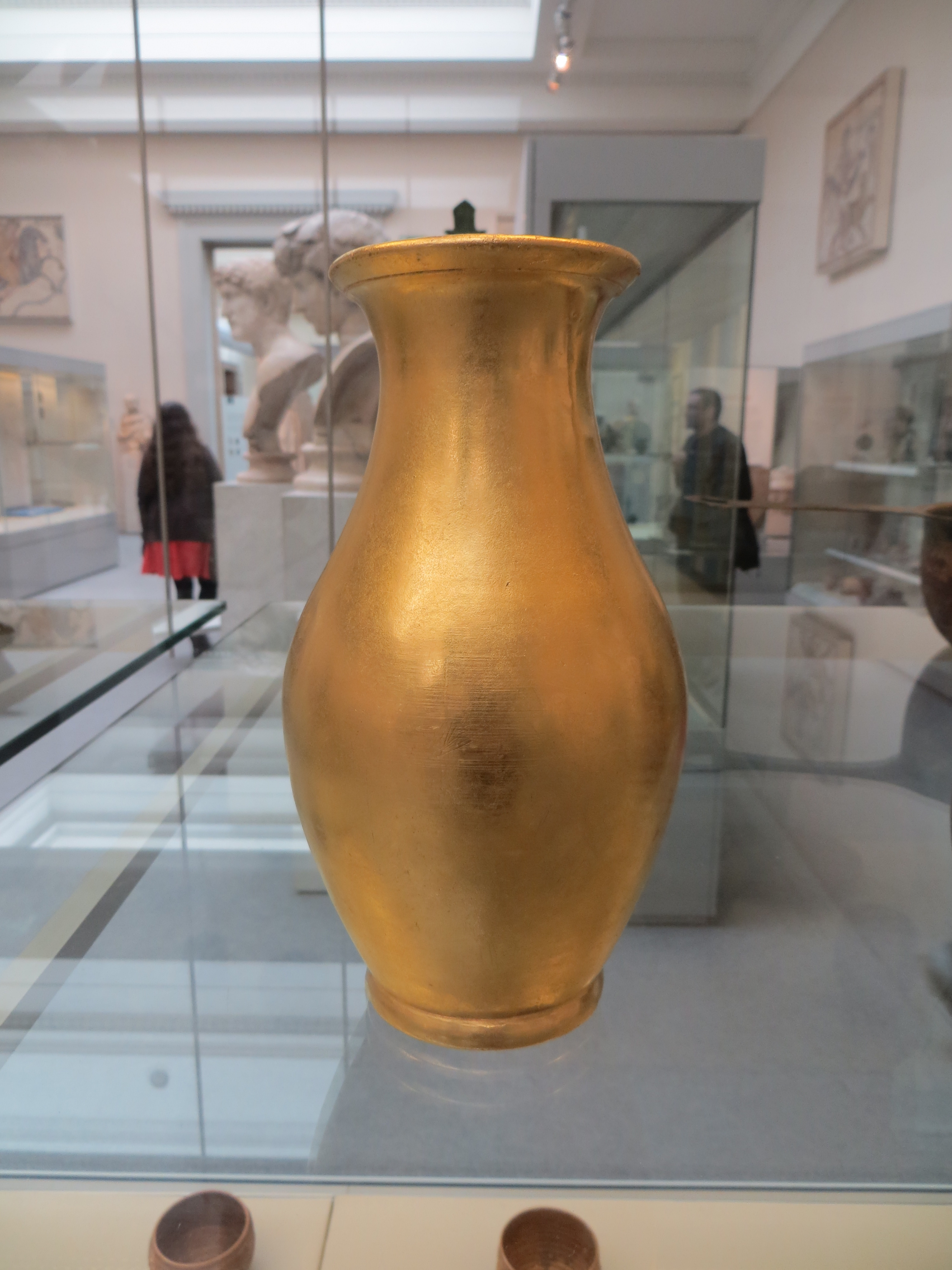
Gold vase found off the sea near Knidos dating to 25BC- 50AD now in the British Museum

=== Antiquity ===
Knidos was a Hellenic city of high antiquity. According to Herodotus' Histories (I.174), the Cnidians were Lacedaemonian colonists; however, the presence of demiurges there argues for foundation or later influence by other Doric Greeks, possibly Argives. Diodorus Siculus (Bibliotheca Historica 5.53) claimed that Cnidus was founded by both Lacedaemonians and Argives. Along with Halicarnassus (present day Bodrum, Turkey) and Kos, and the Rhodian cities of Lindos, Kamiros and Ialyssos it formed the Dorian Hexapolis, which held its confederate assemblies on the Triopian headland, and there celebrated games in honour of Apollo, Poseidon and the nymphs. This was also the site of the Temple of Aphrodite, Knidos.

The city was at first governed by an oligarchic senate, composed of sixty members, and presided over by a magistrate; but, though it is proved by inscriptions that the old names continued to a very late period, the constitution underwent a popular transformation. The situation of the city was favourable for commerce, and the Knidians acquired considerable wealth, and were able to colonize the island of Lipara, and founded a city on Corcyra Nigra in the Adriatic. They ultimately submitted to Cyrus, and from the battle of Eurymedon to the latter part of the Peloponnesian War they were subject to Athens. During the Hellenistic age, Knidos boasted a medical school; however, the theory that this school already existed at the beginning of the classical age is an unwarranted extrapolation.

In their expansion into the region, the Romans easily obtained the allegiance of Knidians, and rewarded them for help given against Antiochus III the Great by leaving them the freedom of their city.

Eudoxus, the astronomer, Ctesias, the writer on Persian history, and Sostratus, the builder of the celebrated Pharos at Alexandria, are the most remarkable of the Knidians mentioned in history. Artemidorus, a minor character in the Shakespeare play "Julius Caesar", was also from Knidos.

=== Byzantine era ===
During the Byzantine period there must still have been a considerable population: for the ruins contain a large number of buildings belonging to the Byzantine style, and Christian sepulchres are common in the neighbourhood.

Bishop Ioannes of Cnidus took part in the Council of Chalcedon in 451 CE and was one of the signatories of the letter that in 458 the bishops of the Roman province of Caria, to which Cnidus belonged, wrote to Byzantine Emperor Leo I the Thracian after the murder of Proterius of Alexandria. Bishop Evander was at the Second Council of Constantinople in 553 and Bishop Stauratius at the Second Council of Nicaea in 787. No longer a residential bishopric, Cnidus is today listed by the Catholic Church as a titular see.

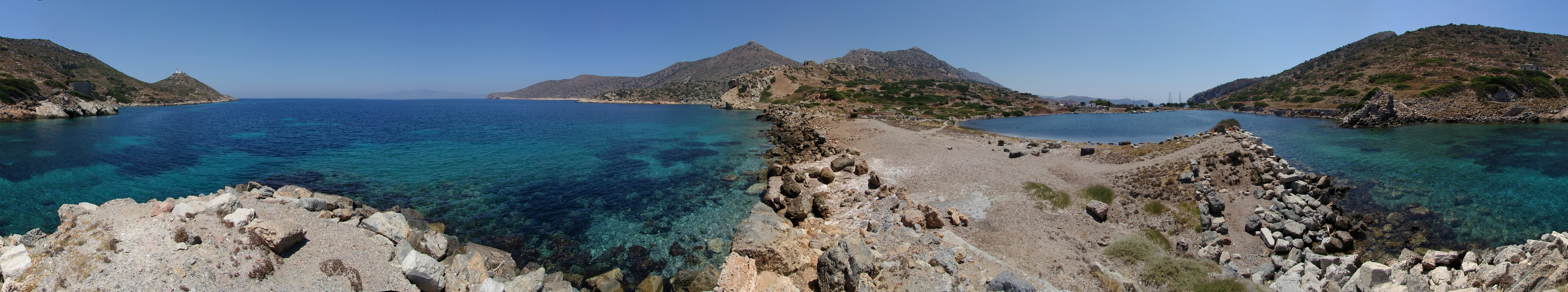
Knidos panorama

== Excavation history ==
The first Western knowledge of the modern site was due to the mission of the Dilettante Society in 1812, and the excavations executed by C. T. Newton in 1857–1858.

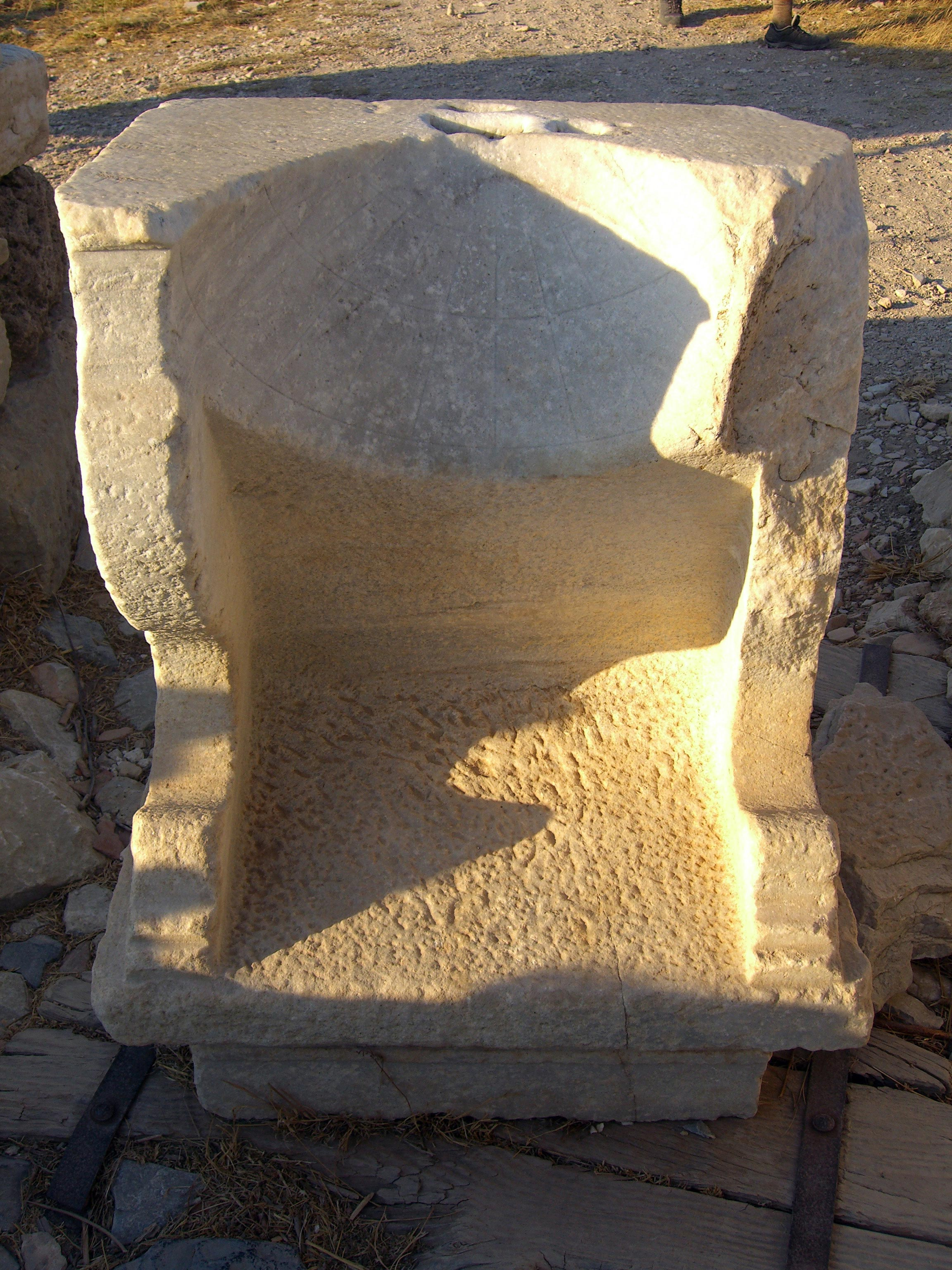
Knidos sundial

The agora, the theatre, an odeum, a temple of Dionysus, a temple of the Muses, a temple of Aphrodite and a great number of minor buildings have been identified, and the general plan of the city has been very clearly made out. The most famous statue by Praxiteles, the Aphrodite of Knidos, was made for Cnidus. It has perished, but late copies exist, of which the most faithful is in the Vatican Museums.

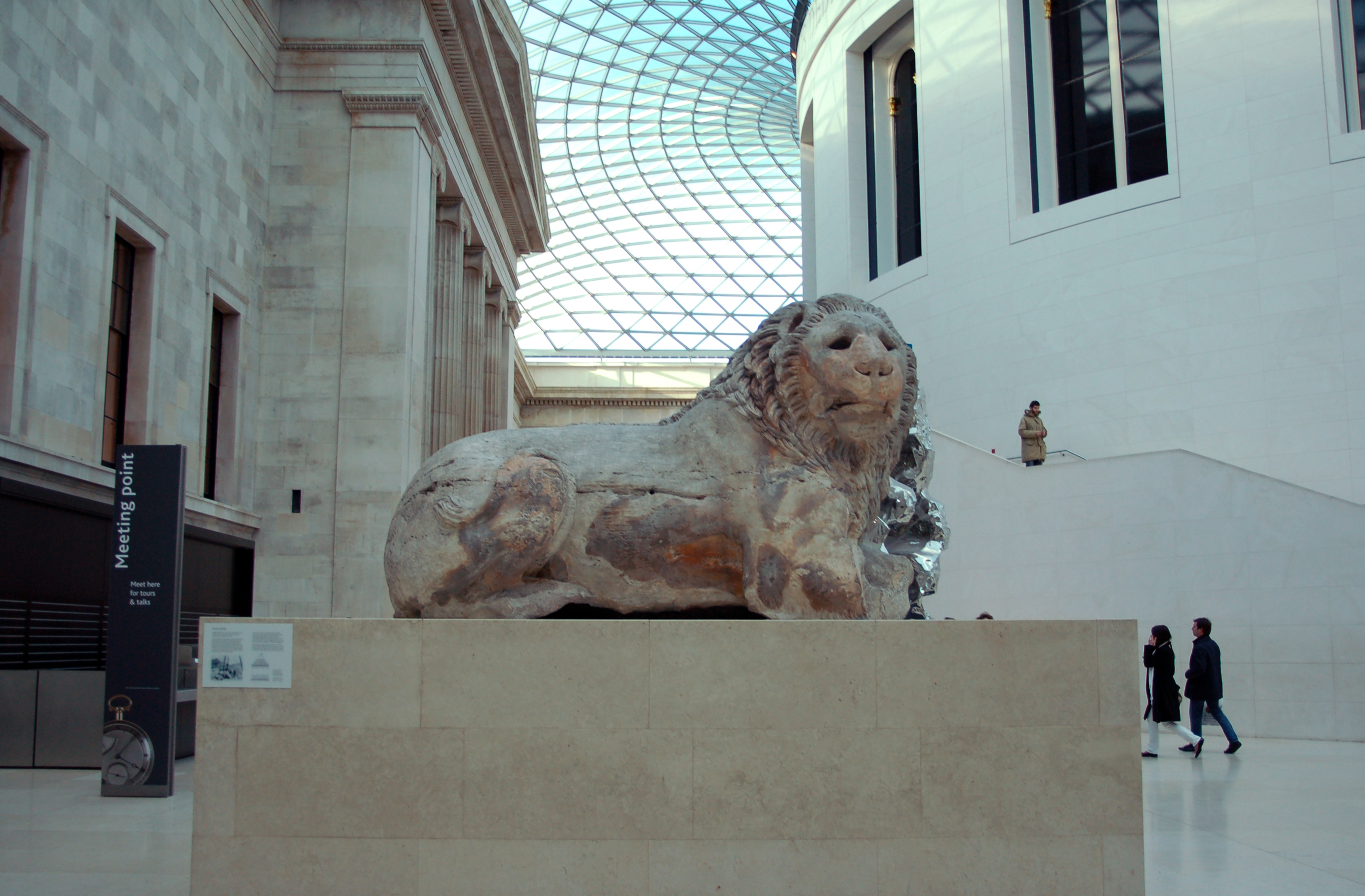
Lion of Knidos on display in the British Museum, London

In a temple enclosure Newton discovered the fine seated statue of Demeter of Knidos, which he sent back to the British Museum, and about three miles south-east of the city he came upon the ruins of a splendid tomb, and a colossal figure of a lion carved out of one block of Pentelic marble, ten feet in length and six in height, which has been supposed to commemorate the great naval victory, the Battle of Cnidus in which Conon defeated the Lacedaemonians in 394 BC. The Knidos Lion is now displayed under the roof of the Great Court in the British Museum.

In 2022, the low tide revealed ruins of an ancient port near the site which is believed to have been the port of Knidos.

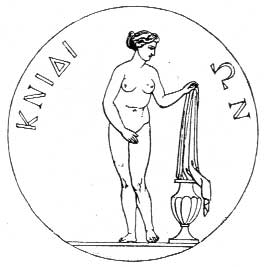
Engraving of a Knidian coin showing the Aphrodite, by Praxiteles

== See also ==
- Battle of Cnidus
- Iris Love
- List of ancient Greek cities
