= Datça =

- District and municipality
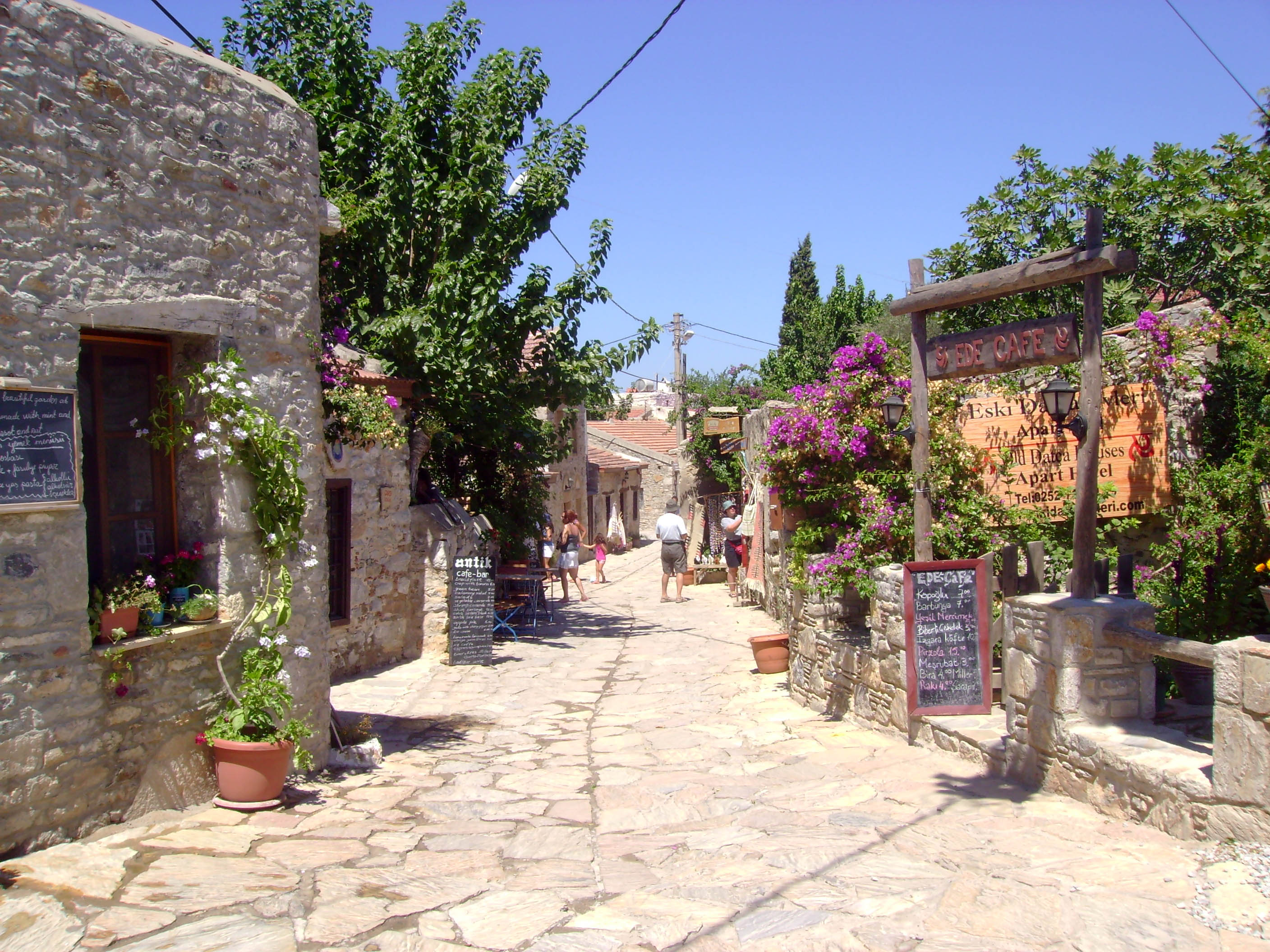
- A street view in Old Datça

- Logo

- Map showing Datça District in Muğla Province

- Location within Turkey Location within Turkey Aegean
- Coordinates: 36.7283°N 27.6869°E
- Country: Turkey
- Province: Muğla

Government
  - Mayor: Aytaç Kurt (CHP)
- Area: 436 km^{2} (168 sq mi)
- Population (2022): 25,029
  - Density: 57.4/km^{2} (149/sq mi)
- Time zone: UTC+3 (TRT)
- Postal code: 48900
- Area code: 0252
- Website: www.datca.bel.tr

Datça is a municipality and district of Muğla Province, Turkey. Its area is 436 km^{2}, and its population is 25,029 (2022). The town center is situated midway through the peninsula which carries the same name as the district and the town (Datça Peninsula). It was a nahiya of Marmaris District until 1928. Datça's first center in village of Reşadiye till 1947, when it was moved to present borough of İskele.

== Name ==
The name Datça comes from Stadia, an ancient town near Cnidus. Stadia developed into Tadya, Dadya, Dadça, and then Datça.

Both the town and the peninsula of Datça were called Reşadiye for a brief period in the beginning of the 20th century, honoring the penultimate Ottoman Sultan Mehmed V Reşad, and some maps may still refer to the peninsula under this name; today Reşadiye is the name of one of the quarters of the town.

== Geography ==
The long and narrow Datça Peninsula, whose outline follows the undulations of small bays and coves facing south or north all along its length which reaches near 100 km (62 mi), corresponds almost exactly to the Datça district, with the addition beyond its isthmus of a small panhandle in the direction of the south-east. The isthmus itself is only several hundred meters wide.

The extreme end of the western tip of the district and the peninsula, the locality called Tekir, is the location of the ancient city of Knidos. There is an ongoing debate on whether or not this location was the original site of the ancient city, a number of sources claiming that until the mid-4th century BCE, Knidos was halfway along the peninsula, near the present-day district center.

The peninsula's eastern end is marked by the fjord-like indentation of Bencik Cove, 1.5 km in length, at the end of which the narrow isthmus where it joins the mainland is found. This point is a natural curiosity which offers a wide view of the Gulf of Gökova in the north and the Gulf of Hisarönü in the south and is called Balıkaşıran (literally, the place where fish may leap across) and is also often used for the portage of small boats. According to Herodotus, during the Persian invasions in 540 BC, the Knidians had sought to dig a canal at this spot as a defensive measure and in order to transform their territory into an island. But an oracle was consulted who reportedly said "If the gods had so willed, they would have made your land an island. Do not pierce the isthmus." Whereupon they surrendered to the Persians.

=== Climate ===
Datça has a hot-summer Mediterranean climate (Köppen: Csa), with very hot, dry summers, and mild, wet winters.

Climate data for Datça (1991–2020)
Month	Jan	Feb	Mar	Apr	May	Jun	Jul	Aug	Sep	Oct	Nov	Dec	Year
Mean daily maximum °C (°F)	15.2 (59.4)	15.6 (60.1)	17.7 (63.9)	20.8 (69.4)	25.6 (78.1)	30.6 (87.1)	33.0 (91.4)	33.3 (91.9)	29.9 (85.8)	25.5 (77.9)	20.7 (69.3)	16.7 (62.1)	23.8 (74.8)
Daily mean °C (°F)	12.3 (54.1)	12.5 (54.5)	14.2 (57.6)	17.0 (62.6)	21.3 (70.3)	25.9 (78.6)	28.4 (83.1)	28.8 (83.8)	25.8 (78.4)	21.8 (71.2)	17.4 (63.3)	13.9 (57.0)	20.0 (68.0)
Mean daily minimum °C (°F)	9.6 (49.3)	9.6 (49.3)	11.0 (51.8)	13.3 (55.9)	17.2 (63.0)	21.7 (71.1)	24.3 (75.7)	24.8 (76.6)	22.0 (71.6)	18.4 (65.1)	14.4 (57.9)	11.3 (52.3)	16.5 (61.7)
Average precipitation mm (inches)	148.3 (5.84)	102.6 (4.04)	63.5 (2.50)	38.2 (1.50)	18.0 (0.71)	0.7 (0.03)	0.2 (0.01)	0.1 (0.00)	8.1 (0.32)	53.8 (2.12)	103.5 (4.07)	150.0 (5.91)	686.9 (27.04)
Average precipitation days (≥ 1.0 mm)	10.9	9.1	6.6	4.4	2.8	1.2	1	1	1.8	3.5	5.8	9.7	57.8
Average relative humidity (%)	65.8	65.6	64.4	63.7	61.5	55.3	53.7	55.3	54.6	61.1	65.6	67.3	61.1
Source: NOAA

== Settlement ==
The quarters of the city of Datça are Reşadiye, Eski Datça 'Old Datça' and İskele 'quay', separated by about a mile from each other. Reşadiye was the original administrative core when the town was renamed Datça and turned into a district center in 1928, before it was moved to İskele quarter. The center town is crossed by the short course of the Datça Stream (Datça Çayı in Turkish).

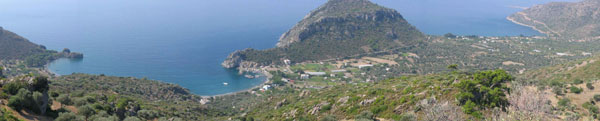
Datça Peninsula is traced by many small bays and coves

The Datça district has nine villages scattered along the peninsula. These are; Cumalı, Emecik, Hızırşah, Karaköy, Kızlan, Mesudiye, Sındı, Yakaköy, Yazıköy. Historically, apart from small coastal patches, Datça Peninsula has two fertile areas along its length. The whole of the eastern half is bare, mountainous and scarcely inhabited. The western part is also mountainous, rising in places over 1,000 meters, but has towards its western end on the south side a considerable extent of well-watered land reaching to the coast at Palamutbükü locality and supporting a group of villages known collectively as Betçe (the five villages). These are; Mesudiye, Sındı, Yakaköy, Yazıköy, Cumalı. The village of Mesudiye, very near the sea shore has a jetty owned by the community of villagers. The village's bay is called Hayıtbükü. Palamutbükü locality, more to the west, also has a little pier which allows boats to moore. Palamutbükü today is a holiday village with a long beach.

The second and larger area of good land is in the middle of the peninsula southwest of the median isthmus dividing the two halves and centered on the town of Datça. The region's promising potential was noted already in the 1880s by the hydrographer Thomas Abel B. Spratt in the following terms:

The plain and valley of Datça is very fertile, having fine groves of olive and valonia, and of almonds and other fruit trees, with abundance of water, if properly utilized.

A point of note on the general settlement pattern of these villages is that the locations chosen were never in the immediate coastline, but always at a mile's distance or more from the sea and at a relatively safe altitude on the slopes of a hill. The reason was from times immemorial was the fear of pirates, advantaged as they were by the intricate geology of shores of southwestern Turkey and of the many islands and islets that are its natural extensions, in an environment not unlike that of the Caribbean Sea. Piracy remained a serious security problem well until the beginning of the 20th century.

== Composition ==
There are 12 neighbourhoods in Datça District:

- Cumalı
- Datça
- Emecik
- Hızırşah
- İskele
- Karaköy
- Kızlan
- Mesudiye
- Reşadiye
- Sındı
- Yakaköy
- Yazıköy

== Tourism ==
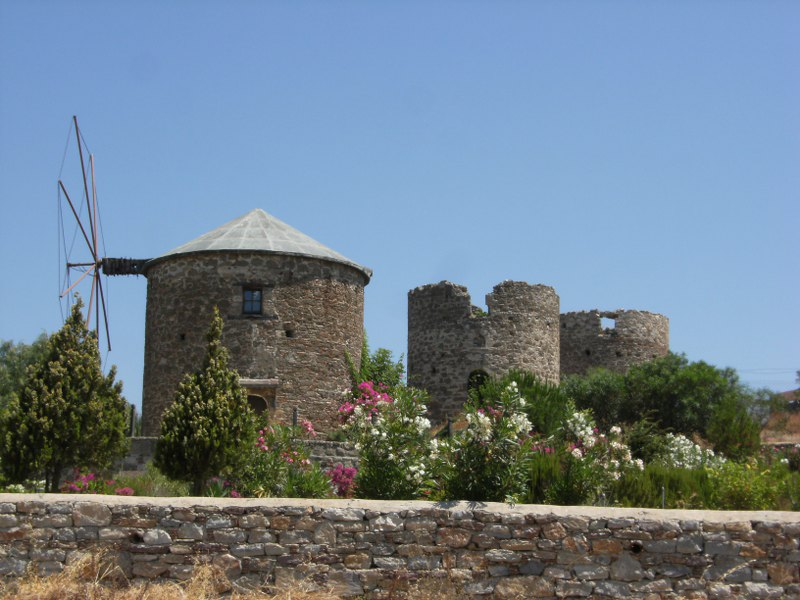
Windmills of Datça

Datça Peninsula is popular among tourists, especially by mariners, because of its many coves and larger bays, which are promoted as part of the Blue Cruise along Turkey's southwest coast. Boats (usually gulets) depart from Bodrum, Marmaris, or Datça.

The road from Marmaris to Datça is rough in parts.

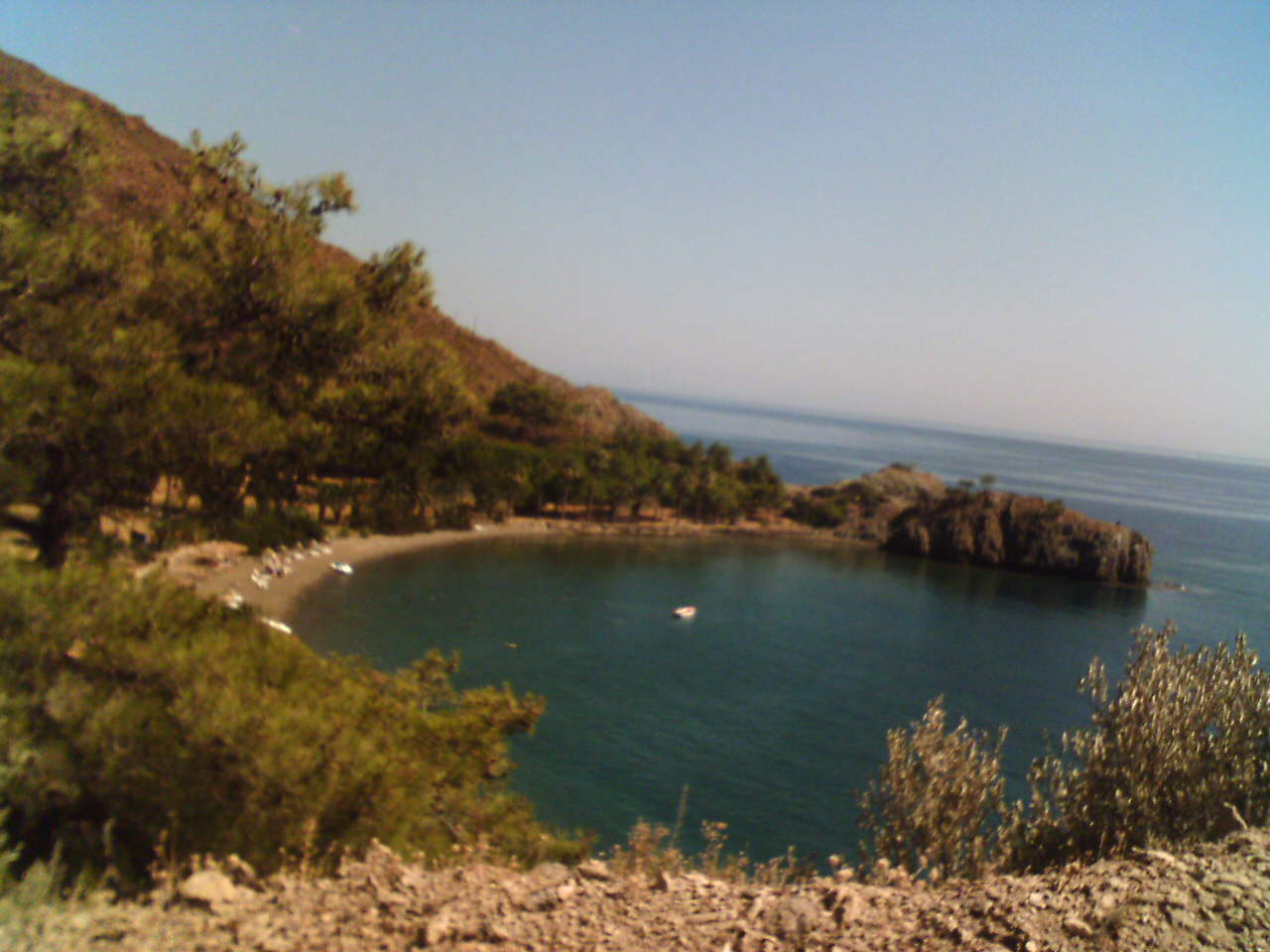
A small cove in Datça

Apart from the traditional settlements, there are also a dozen recently constructed vacation villages on the peninsula.

Datça has become a major rock climbing destination since about 2013, most popular from fall to spring.

== Forest Fires ==
On 29 August 2012, a fire in the town of Emecik, Datca burned 75 hectares of forest.

== Notable natives ==
In Turkish literature, Datça is associated with the poet and the accomplished translator (notably of Shakespeare) Can Yücel who spent the last decades of his life in Datça and is also buried here.

== Twin Towns ==
Houma, Louisiana, United States

== See also ==
- Fethiye
- Bodrum
- Datça Peninsula
- Gulf of Gökova
- Marinas in Turkey
- Foreign purchases of real estate in Turkey
