= Cleveland Apollo =

4th century BCE bronze statue

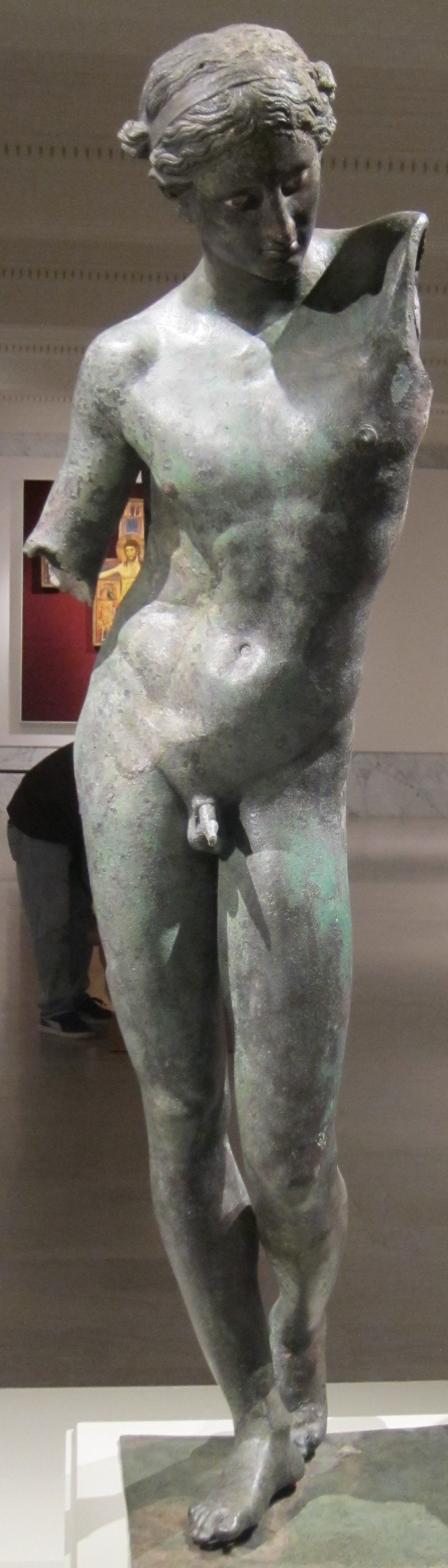
- Artist: Attributed to Praxiteles
- Year: 350 BCE
- Location: Cleveland Museum of Art, Cleveland

The Cleveland Apollo is a 4th-century BCE life-size bronze Ancient Greek statue, now in the Cleveland Museum of Art. It acquired it in 2004 using the Severance and Greta Millikin Purchase Fund. The Museum attributed the piece to Praxiteles (circa 400 to 330 BCE). Technical features of the Cleveland Apollo are consistent with the Late Classical Period, during Praxiteles's lifetime. Scientific investigation of the sculpture and the separated parts shows that they are from the same casting. The age of the casting is still under review as of 2017. Scholarly investigation has raised several questions about it being a Praxiteles original.

== Description ==
Apollo the Python-Slayer, also known as Apollo Sauroktonos (Lizard-Slayer), is attributed by the Cleveland Museum staff to Praxiteles from about 350 BCE. It is bronze with copper and a stone inlay. The height is 150 cm, the width is 66.8 cm, and the depth is 50.3 cm. The statue consists of its right arm above the elbow a large portion of the left arm, and the shoulder. Most of the left forearm and the left hand survive along with the small reptilian creature. The reptilian figure has the strange anatomy of a coiled snake with legs of differing sizes and attached asymmetrically. The inconsistencies in the reptile prove it is not a natural figure, but a smaller python from the world of mythology. The figure, hand, forearm and reptilian creature belong together. They were cast from the same melt as confirmed by analysis of the composition of the metal, the amount of lead in the metal, and the history of corrosion.

In the first century AD, Pliny the Elder wrote in his Natural History (34.69–70), that the famous fourth century BCE Athenian sculptor Praxiteles created a bronze sculpture depicting Apollo in his youth ready to stab a lizard with an arrow. Pliny used the epithet sauroktonos (lizard-slayer) to refer to the Praxiteles masterpiece. His youthful Apollo leans toward a tree trunk where he rests his raised left hand. He holds an arrow in his right hand about to stab at the lizard that runs up the tree. Here, a serious mythological subject is treated as a sport or pastime with a slight allusion to the religious type. The Cleveland Apollo artist following the same treatment also reveled in the youthful beauty and grace of the boyish form, the curve in its position and the delicacy with which it is modeled. It is likely that the figure has been exaggerated by the copyist similar to other copies of the Sauroktonos and other figures of Apollo that appear to be based on a Praxiteles original. Two other copies are possibly the work of a contemporary imitator. The two are under life-size figures that represent Apollo and Dionysus. The head in the Apollo agrees in pose and inclination to other works. It bears witness to the influence of Polykleita in that it has close-growing parted hair hanging down over the forehead in symmetrical curls (see the figure in the Gallery).

Several marble copies of the Apollo made in Rome have survived and are in indication of its popularity into the Imperial period. Wealthy Romans acquired them to decorate their homes and country villas. The copies show a youthful Apollo leaning on a thick, leafless tree trunk with a lizard climbing up the surface. This sculptural type has been known as Apollo Sauroktonos since Roman times. Even Roman coins and gems engraved with Apollo show the sculptural type. Rather than a stout tree trunk, many show Apollo with a young slender tree.

== Controversy about originality ==
=== Scientific investigation ===
Comparatively few bronzes like Apollo exist for study. The Cleveland Museum has a rare opportunity to expand the small body of knowledge regarding casting large bronzes during the classical period. Visual examination is a first step in an evaluation. The borescope (a long flexible tube with a camera and fiber-optic lighting) was used to inspect the inside of the head and found several modern repair materials. A CT scan (computed tomography), like an x-ray, was done resulting in information to allow the bronze to be seen in slices. Viewing the slices digitally allowed the for higher resolution and development of a three-dimensional digital form. The figure is made of highly leaded bronze, as appropriate for a bronze casting during classical antiquity. Samples of the bronze and small pieces of wood were taken to be carbon-dated to show when the sculpture was exposed to high heat. As of 2017, the samples were still being studied.

More recent testing and analysis of the Cleveland Apollo have resolved several questions. The reassembled bronze fragments, hand, forearm, and python belong together; they were cast from the same melt as confirmed by the metal composition, corrosion history and the lead content. The corrosion suggests that the figure was exposed to the atmosphere over an extended time after it was excavated. This corrosion testing revealed that the base plate does not appear to be entirely original. But the lead is similar suggesting that it may be part of the original and repurposed as the base plate. The figure displays evidence of having been in a fire occurring after excavation. Samples of the charcoal from the forearm were carbon-dated as being much older than the Roman or Greek periods. It is possible that the samples were contaminated during restoration.

Efforts between 2009 and 2021 to improve understanding of the Apollo have led to more questions. The testing has advanced the understanding of the sculpture, but the statue will continue to provide new chances for more research.

=== Scholarly investigation ===
The Apollo (also known as Sauroktonos) is a mainstay in classical art history. It has been considered a major work of Praxiteles and is known from Roman marble replicas, coins, and gems. The Apollo is one work in a field where the personal styles of famous Greek sculptors are named in ancient sources but whose masterpieces rarely, if ever, survive as originals. How this statue of a young man and a lizard came to achieve iconic status in art history is an interesting story and one that may deserve to be reexamined considering both the old and more recent evidence. The Roman author Pliny the Elder in the first century CE, in his Natural History (34.60-70), noted that the famous Athenian sculptor Praxiteles produced a sculpture (in the fourth century BCE) in bronze of a youthful Apollo about to use an arrow to stab a lizard. Pliny used the name sauroktonos (lizard-slayer) for the Praxiteles masterpiece. In 2004, the Cleveland Museum of Art obtained the only known bronze version of this sculptural type (several marble copies from Rome survive). With rare exceptions, the original sculptures from Greece are works of second or inferior rank.

Questions have arisen about the identification and attribution of this Roman statue type because the attribution is based only on a passage in Pliny. Recently two things have caused a reevaluation of Pliny's credit for the work to Praxiteles and the identification of the statue. The first is the Cleveland Museum's acquisition of a life-sized bronze of the Apollo Sauroktonos type. The Museum claims it is a Praxiteles original. The second is the first monographic exhibit dedicated to the work of Praxiteles held at the Louvre in Paris in 2007. An essay in the exhibition catalog summarizes the scholarship and issues surrounding the Sauroktonos type. While the Cleveland Apollo is discussed in the catalog, it was not included in the exhibition due to issues raised about its questionable provenance. The author of the catalog for the Paris exhibition commented on the work saying "In spite of its abundance, the documentation does not permit us to recognize this work in detail and the context of its creation completely eludes us. The Cleveland bronze was not included in the Paris exhibit because of issues raised over its questionable provenance but it is discussed briefly in the catalog." The exclusion of the Cleveland bronze – surely not Praxiteles's original – was due to objections of Greek authorities regarding its authenticity. It is the only existing full-scale version of this type in bronze, the original medium according to Pliny. Because there is no indisputably original freestanding sculpture from Praxiteles, one of the most famous classical antiquity artists, it would be unprecedented to have one that survives.

== Provenance ==
In 2004, the Apollo Sauroktonos was acquired by the Cleveland Museum of Art. The Apollo was thought to be the only known bronze version of the sculpture. It had been recovered from an East German estate after reunification of West and East Germany in 1990. An elderly German man who was the legal heir successfully reclaimed his estate. While cleaning up the estate he found the sculpture in an old debris pile. Before World War II, the estate belonged to his great-uncle and the heir remembered seeing it frequently when he visited as a young man. Because he believed it to be an 18th- or 19th-century copy of an ancient work, he sold it rather than investing in reconstruction. It was conserved later when it was identified as ancient. In 2002, a representative of the Cleveland Museum of Art saw it in the Geneva gallery of Phoenix Ancient Art, and the museum purchased it in 2004. The Apollo showed signs of severe damage that could have occurred during combat between the Nazis and the Soviet Red Army in eastern Germany, Praxiteles's masterwork was stranded at the time between the mayhem of World War II and the lengthy Cold War. The Apollo Sauroktonos was rescued by the art market.

== Praxiteles ==
Praxiteles was a master sculpturer with work that won great regard with modern artists and critics. In the popular estimate of his own time, he was the most famous of all Greek sculptors. His work was the most highly prized of Greco-Roman work at that time due to its personal and individual charm, the sweeping facile lines of his work, and the sensuous beauty of form. Among all of the gods, we should expect the art of Praxiteles to be focused on Apollo and Artemis. Several statues of these deities are recorded among his works, and many of them in museums are derived from him or from his pupils. Maybe the best known of the statues of Apollo attributed to Praxiteles is the Sauroctonus, or lizard-slayer. Praxiteles's treatment of it was popular and preserved in several copies. It is probable that with the copies of similar figures of Apollo apparently copied from a Praxitelean original, the copyist exaggerated the softness of the figure almost to effeminacy.

== Gallery ==
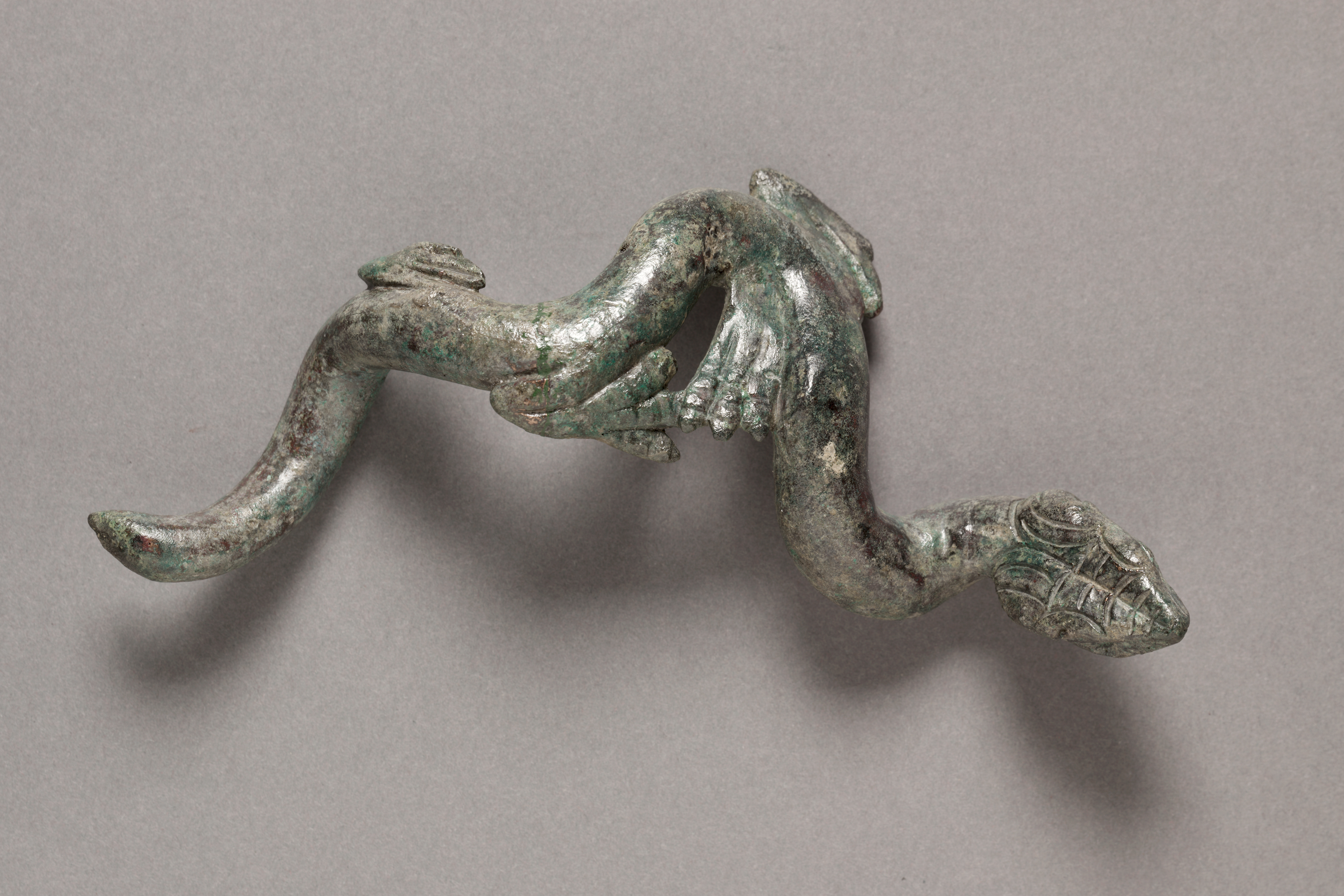
The Python to be slain. Some suggest it is a lizard.

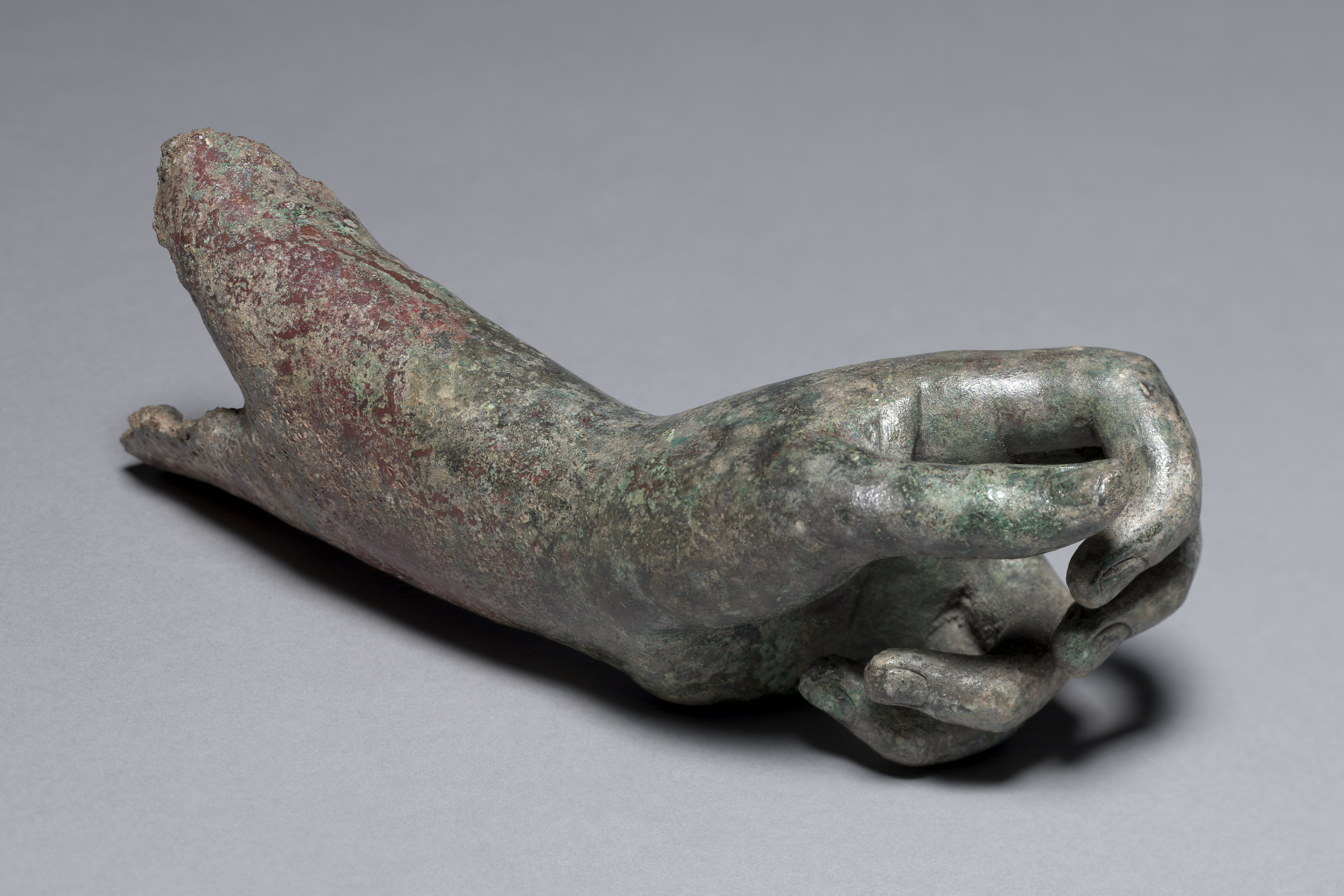
Left forearm and hand

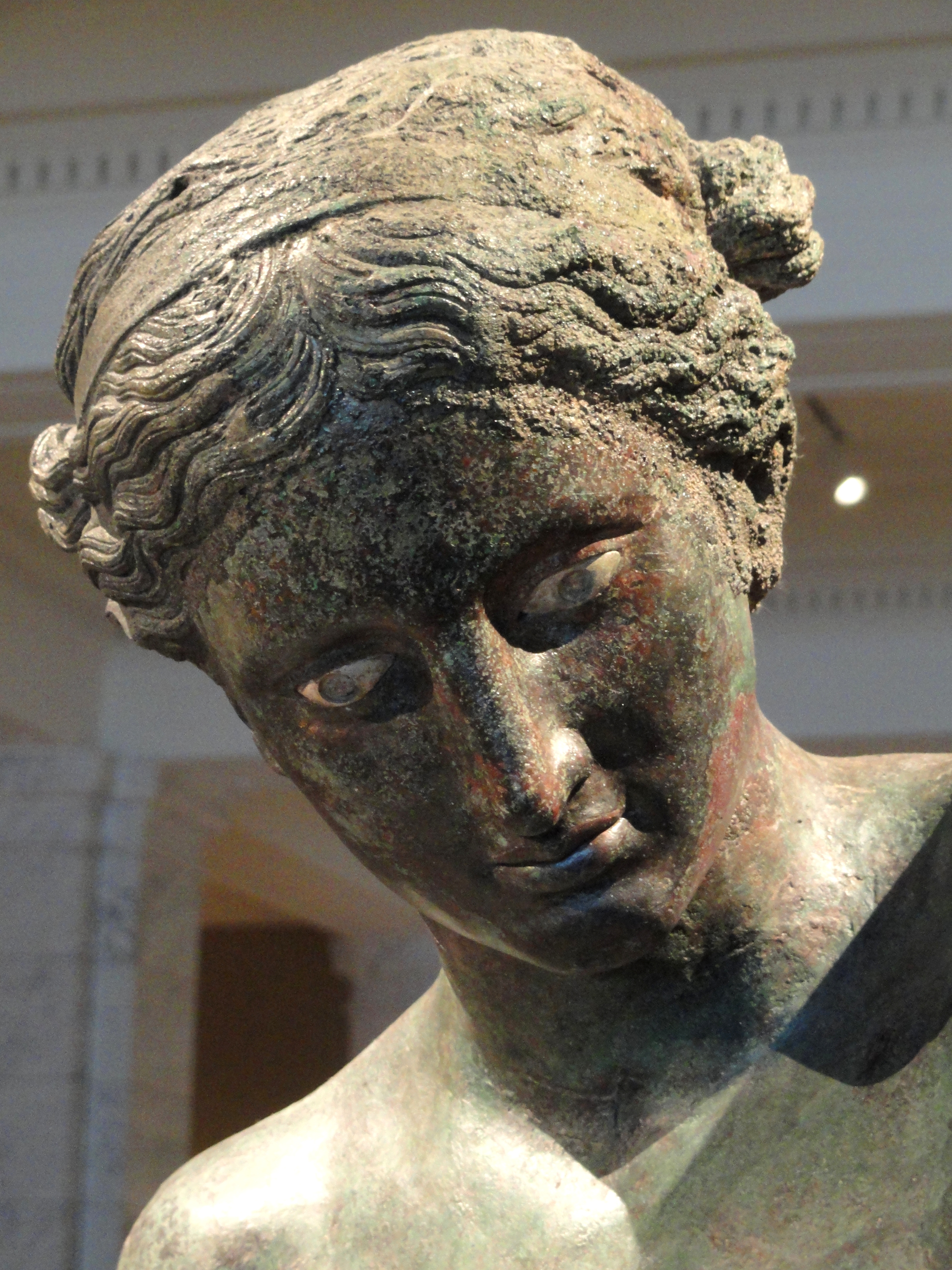
Closeup of Apollo's head and the arrangement of his hair.

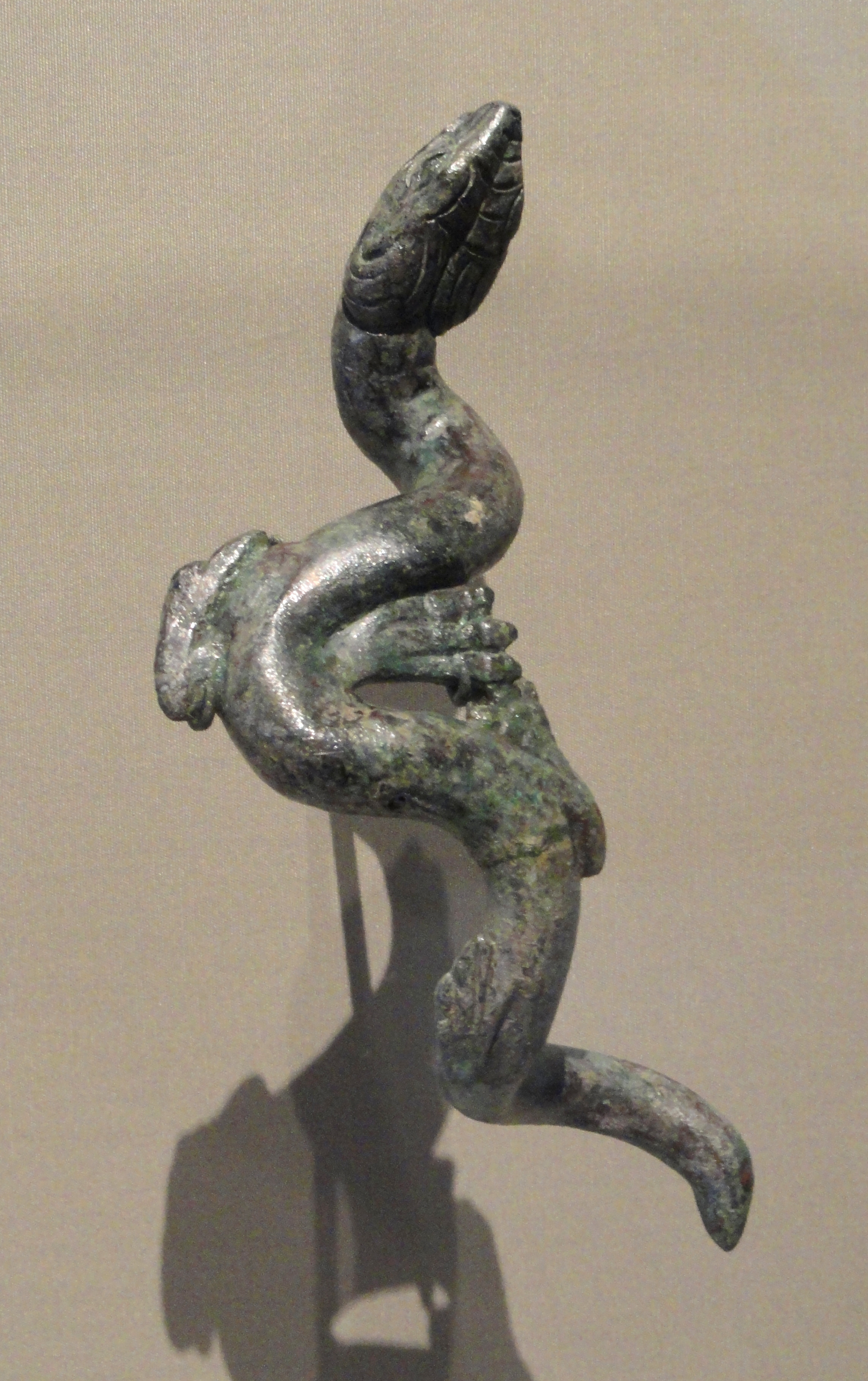
The snake and Apollo's hand.

== See also ==
- Apollo Sauroktonos
