= Praxiteles =

4th-century BC Athenian sculptor

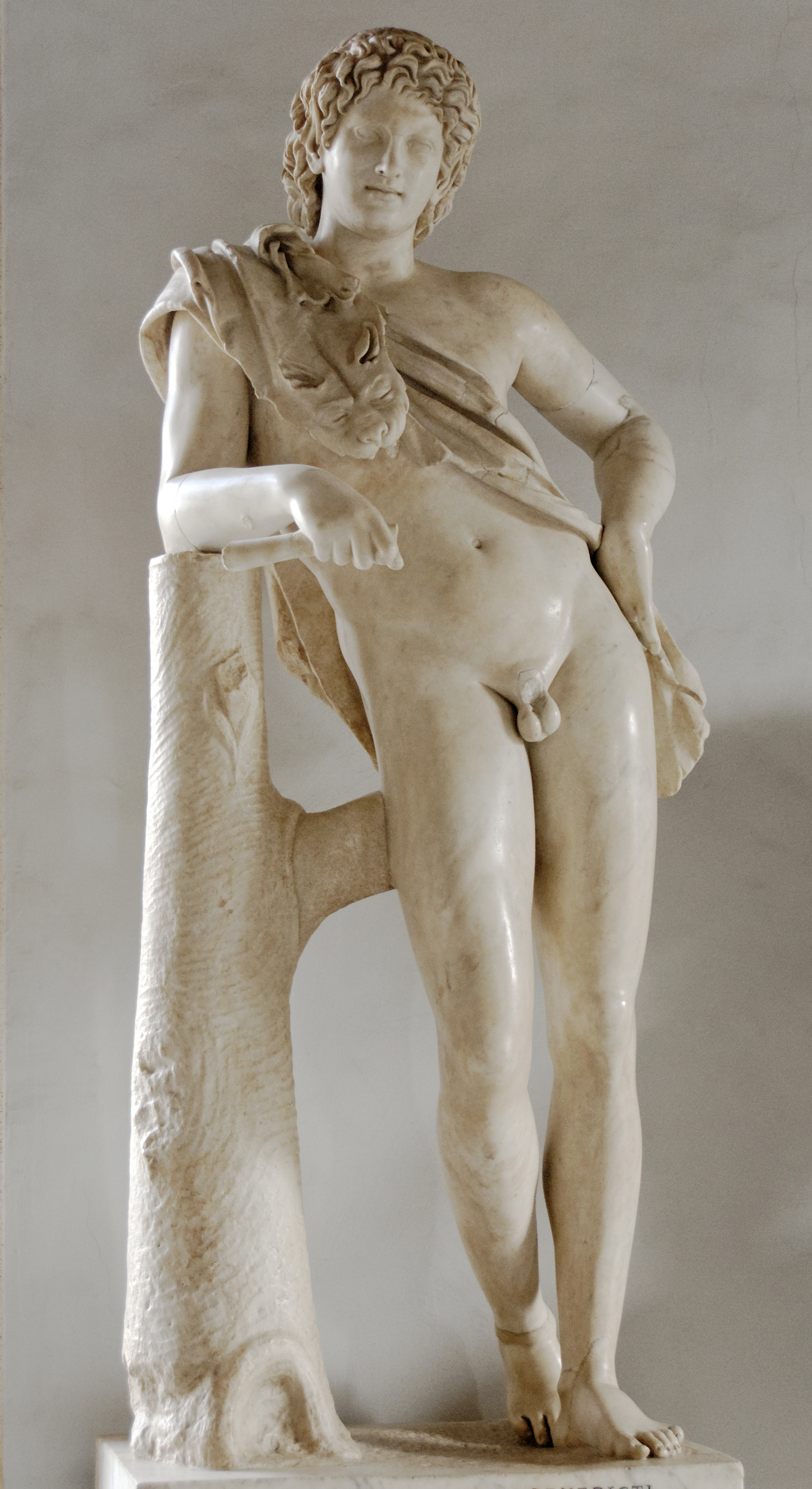
The Resting Satyr

Praxiteles (/prækˈsɪtɪliːz/; Greek: Πραξιτέλης) of Athens, the son of Cephisodotus the Elder, was the most renowned of the Attic sculptors of the 4th century BC. He was the first to sculpt the nude female form in a life-size statue. While no indubitably attributable sculpture by Praxiteles is extant, numerous copies of his works have survived; several authors, including Pliny the Elder, wrote of his works; and coins engraved with silhouettes of his various famous statuary types from the period still exist.

A supposed relationship between Praxiteles and his beautiful model, the Thespian courtesan Phryne, has inspired speculation and interpretation in works of art ranging from painting (Gérôme) to comic opera (Saint-Saëns) to shadow play (Donnay).

Some writers have maintained that there were two sculptors of the name Praxiteles. One was a contemporary of Pheidias, and the other his more celebrated grandson. Though the repetition of the same name in every other generation is common in Greece, there is no certain evidence for either position.

== Date ==
Accurate dates for Praxiteles are elusive, but it is likely that he was no longer working in the time of Alexander the Great, in the absence of evidence that Alexander employed Praxiteles, as he probably would have done. Pliny's date, 364 BC, is probably that of one of his most noted works.

The subjects chosen by Praxiteles were either human beings or the dignified and less elderly deities such as Apollo, Hermes and Aphrodite rather than Zeus, Poseidon or Themis. He probably invented the S-curve.

Praxiteles and his school worked almost entirely in Parian marble. At the time the marble quarries of Paros were at their best; nor could any marble be finer for the purposes of the sculptor than that of which the Hermes from Olympia was fashioned. Some of the statues of Praxiteles were coloured by the painter Nicias, and in the opinion of the sculptor they gained greatly by this treatment.

== Works ==
=== Hermes and the Infant Dionysus ===
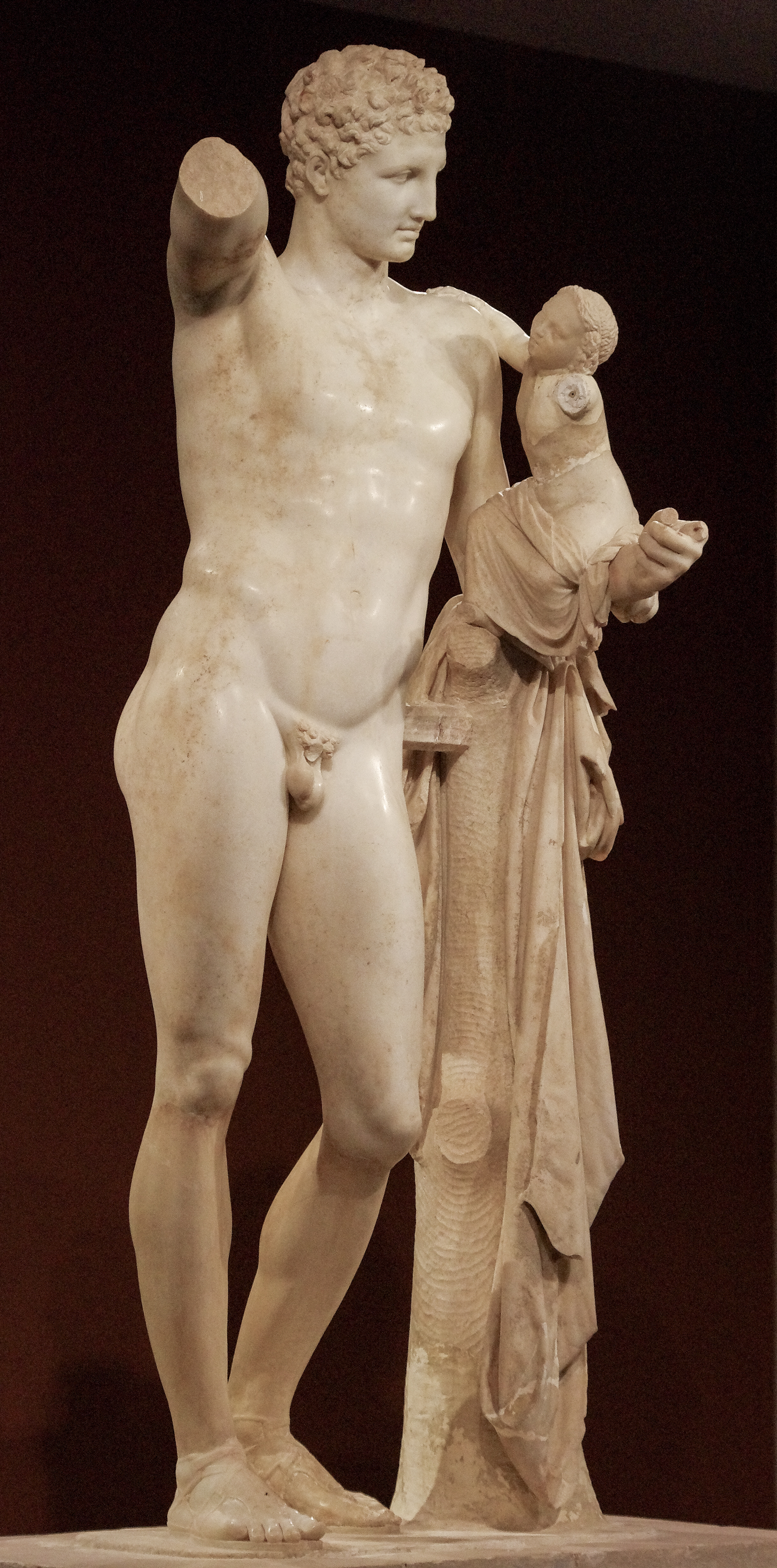
Hermes bearing the child Dionysos, Archaeological Museum of Olympia

This statue was discovered in 1877, in Olympia, Greece, by a team of German archeologists led by Ernst Curtius. It was discovered in the Temple of Hera, which the Greek writer Pausanias had visited in the 2nd century CE. Because Pausanias recorded the presence of a statue of Hermes and Dionysus in this temple, which he attributed to Praxiteles, scholars have identified it with this one. Debate has been ongoing, however, over whether it actually is one of his works.

In 1911, the Encyclopædia Britannica noted that

"Our knowledge of Praxiteles has received a great addition, and has been placed on a satisfactory basis, by the discovery at Olympia in 1877 of his statue of Hermes with the Infant Dionysus, a statue which has become famous throughout the world. [...] the figure of the Hermes, full and solid without being fleshy, at once strong and active, is a masterpiece, and the play of surface is astonishing. In the head we have a remarkably rounded and intelligent shape, and the face expresses the perfection of health and enjoyment. This statue must for the future be our best evidence for the style of Praxiteles. It altogether confirms and interprets the statements as to Praxiteles made by Pliny and other ancient critics."

Later opinions have varied, reaching a low with the sculptor Aristide Maillol, who railed, "It's kitsch, it's frightful, it's sculpted in Marseille soap". In 1948, Carl Blümel published it in a monograph as The Hermes of a Praxiteles, reversing his earlier (1927) opinion that it was a Roman copy, finding it not 4th century either, but referring it instead to a Hellenistic sculptor, a younger Praxiteles of Pergamon. (Note: Attribution to a younger Praxiteles on the basis of the inscription Pergamon VIII, 1, 137 – as first suggested by Morgan (1937). Carpenter (1954) dismissed this younger Praxiteles as a phantom.)

The sculpture was located where Pausanias had seen it in the late 2nd century AD. Hermes is represented in the act of carrying the child Dionysus to the nymphs who were charged with his rearing. The uplifted right arm is missing, but the possibility that the god holds out to the child a bunch of grapes to excite his desire would reduce the subject to a genre figure, Waldstein (1882) noted that Hermes looks past the child, "the clearest and most manifest outward sign of inward dreaming". The statue is today exhibited at the Archaeological Museum of Olympia.

Opposing arguments have been made that the statue is a copy by a Roman copyist, perhaps of a work by Praxiteles that the Romans had purloined. (Note: The career of the Olympia Hermes reputation was summed up by Wycherley (1982); his advice was to trust to the judgment of Pausanias in this matter.) Wallace (1940) suggested a 2nd-century date and a Pergamene origin on the basis of the sandal type. Other assertions have been attempted by scholars to prove the origins of the statue on the basis of the unfinished back, the appearance of the drapery, and the technique used with the drilling of the hair; however scholars cannot conclusively use any of these arguments to their advantage because exceptions exist in both Roman and Greek sculpture.

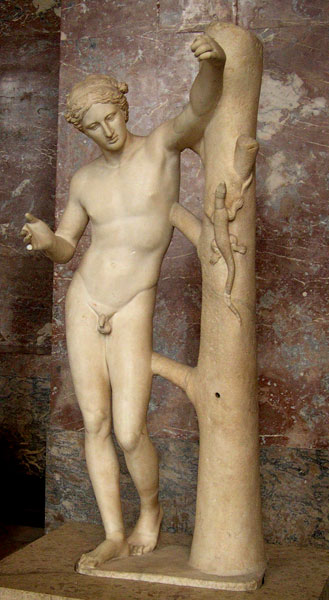
The Louvre Apollo Sauroctonos

=== Apollo Sauroktonos ===
Other works that appear to be copies of Praxiteles' sculpture express the same gracefulness in repose and indefinable charm as the Hermes and the Infant Dionysus. Among the most notable of these are the Apollo Sauroktonos, or the lizard-slayer, which portrays a youth leaning against a tree and idly striking with an arrow at a lizard. Several Roman copies from the 1st century are known including those at the Louvre Museum, the Vatican Museums, and the National Museums Liverpool.

On June 22, 2004, the Cleveland Museum of Art (CMA), announced the acquisition of an ancient bronze sculpture of Apollo Sauroktonos. The work is alleged to be the only near-complete original work by Praxiteles, though the dating and attribution of the sculpture will continue to be studied. The work was to be included in the 2007 Praxiteles exhibition organized by the Louvre Museum in Paris, but pressure from Greece, which disputes the work's provenance and legal ownership, caused the French to exclude it from the show.

=== Apollo Lykeios ===
The Apollo Lykeios or Lycian Apollo, another Apollo-type reclining on a tree, is usually attributed to Praxiteles. It shows the god resting on a support (a tree trunk or tripod), his right arm touching the top of his head, and his hair fixed in braids on the top of a head in a haircut typical of childhood. It is called "Lycian" not after Lycia itself, but after its identification with a lost work described by Lucian as being on show in the Lykeion, one of the gymnasia of Athens.

=== Capitoline Satyr ===
The Resting Satyr of the Capitol at Rome has commonly been regarded as a copy of one of the Satyrs of Praxiteles, but it cannot be identified in the list of his works. Moreover, the style is hard and poor; a far superior replica exists in a torso in the Louvre. The attitude and character of the work are certainly of Praxitelean school.

=== Leto, Apollo, and Artemis ===
Excavations at Mantineia in Arcadia have brought to light the base of a group of Leto, Apollo, and Artemis by Praxiteles. This base was doubtless not the work of the great sculptor himself, but of one of his assistants. Nevertheless, it is pleasing and historically valuable. Pausanias (viii. 9, I) thus describes the base, "on the base which supports the statues there are sculptured the Muses and Marsyas playing the flutes (auloi)." Three slabs which have survived represent Apollo; Marsyas; a slave, and six of the Muses, the slab which held the other three having disappeared.

=== Leconfield Head ===
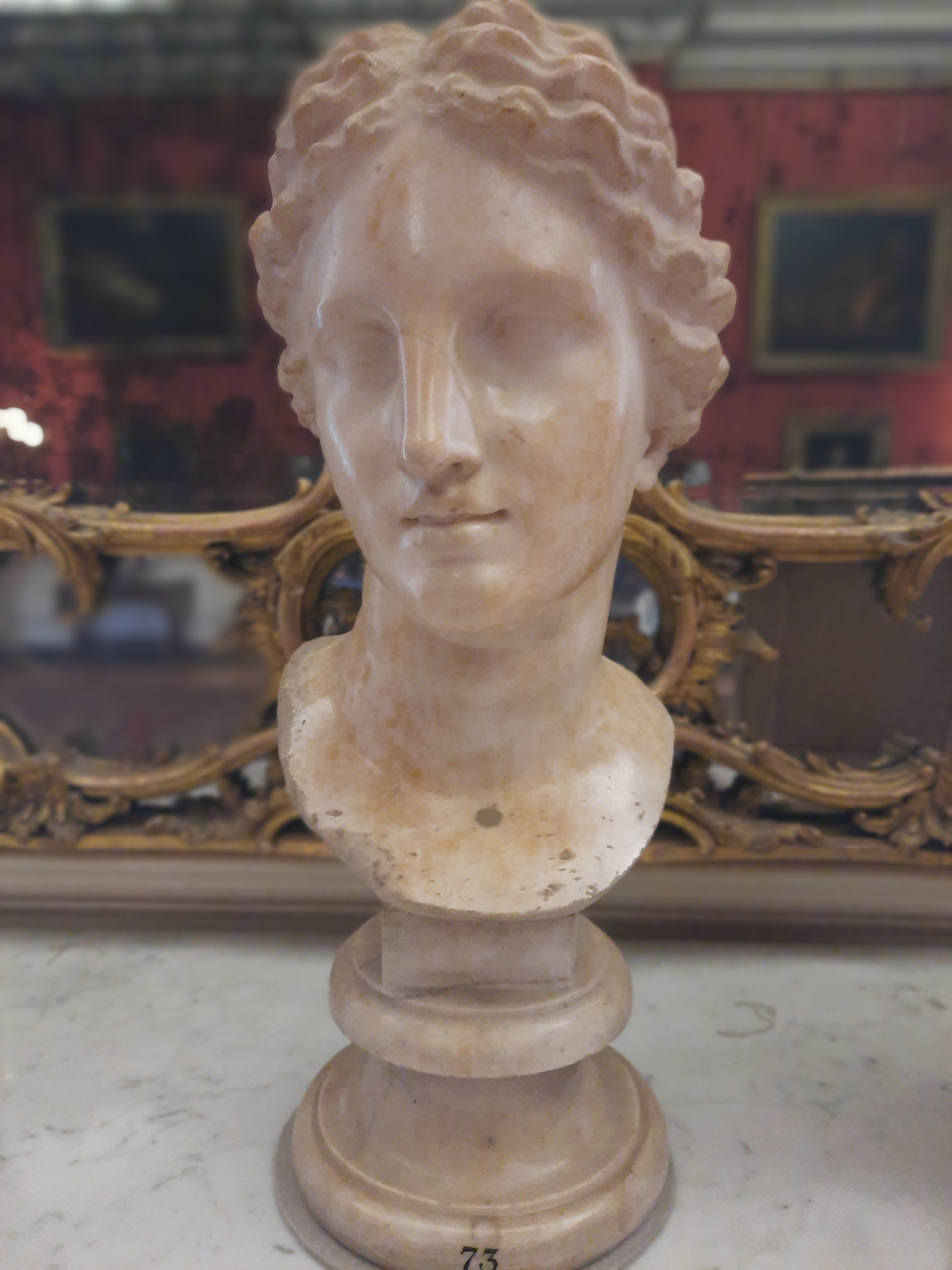
Leconfield Head at Petworth House

The Leconfield Head (a head of the Aphrodite of Cnidus type, included in the 2007 exhibition at the Louvre) in the Red Room, Petworth House, West Sussex, UK, was claimed by Adolf Furtwängler to be an actual work of Praxiteles, based on its style and its intrinsic quality. The Leconfield Head, the keystone of the Greek antiquities at Petworth was probably bought from Gavin Hamilton in Rome in 1755.

=== Aberdeen Head ===
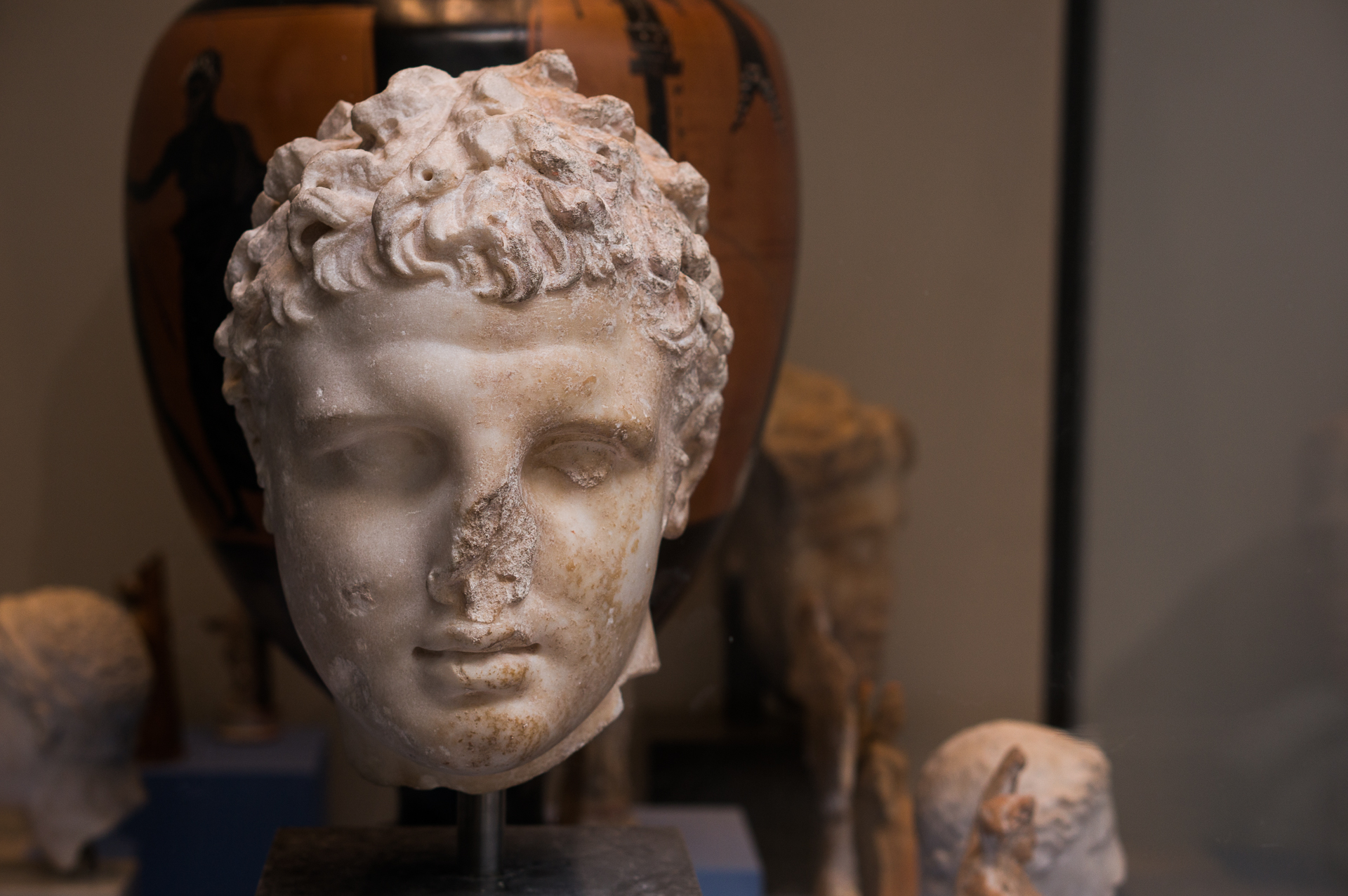
The Aberdeen Head in gallery 20 at the British Museum

The Aberdeen Head, whether of Hermes or of a youthful Heracles, in the British Museum, is linked to Praxiteles by its striking resemblance to the Hermes of Olympia. Dated between 325-280 BC, the statue, of which only the head is extant, would have been crowned with a metal wreath in his hair, for which the dowel holes survive.

=== Aphrodite of Cnidus ===
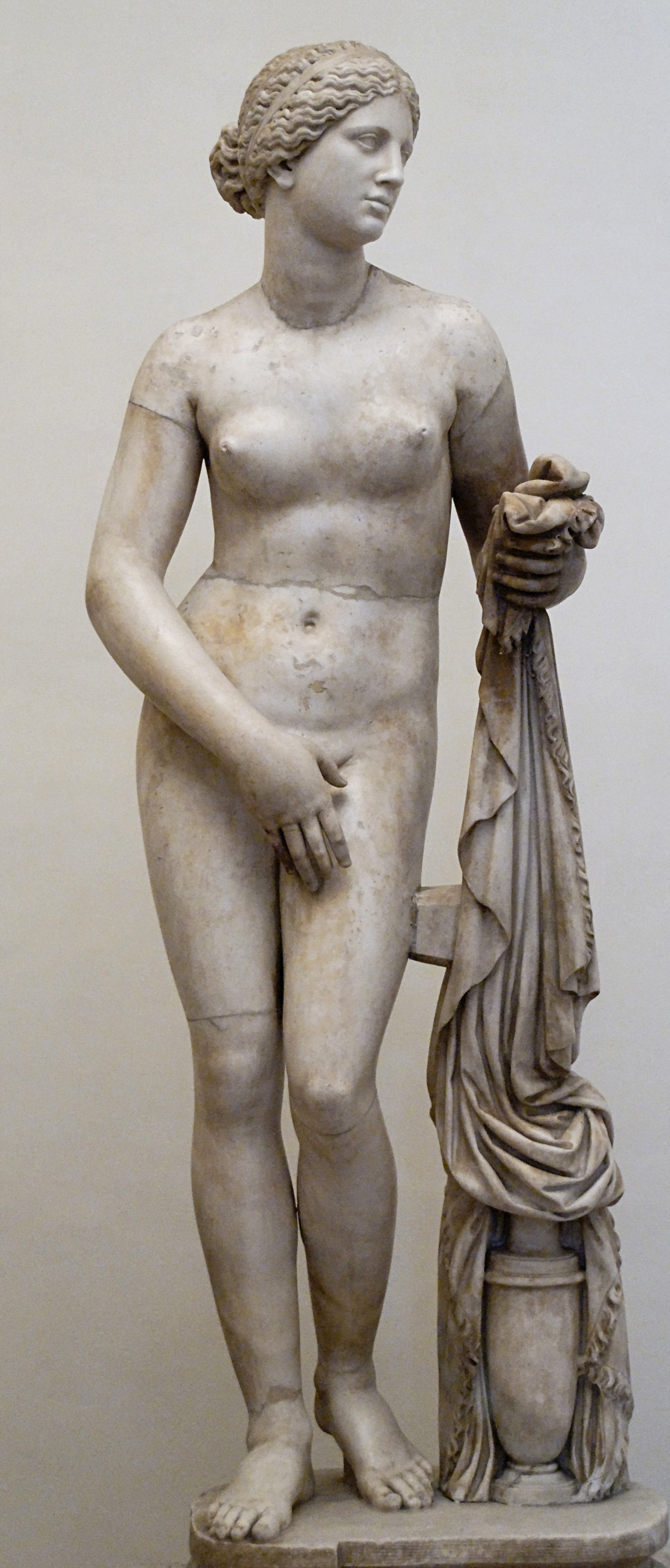
Aphrodite of Cnidus

Aphrodite of Cnidus was Praxiteles's most famous statue. It was the first time in Greek art that a full-scale female figure was portrayed nude. It was bought by the people of Cnidus, and according to Pliny valued so highly by them that they refused to sell it to King Nicomedes in exchange for discharging the city's enormous debt. Many copies survive, the Colonna Venus in the Vatican Museums often having been considered the most faithful to the original.

Its renown was such, that it was immortalised in a lyric epigram:

Paris did see me naked,
Adonis, and Anchises,
except I knew all three of them.
Where did the sculptor see me?

=== Artemis of Antikyra ===
According to Pausanias there was a statue of Artemis made by Praxiteles in her temple in Anticyra of Phokis. The appearance of the statue, which represented the goddess with a torch and an arch in her hands and a dog at her feet, is known from a 2nd-century BC bronze coin of the city. A recently discovered dedicatory inscription of the 3rd-2nd century identifies the goddess at Antikya as Artemis Eleithyia.

=== Uncertain attributions ===
Vitruvius (vii, praef. 13) lists Praxiteles as an artist on the Mausoleum of Maussollos and Strabo (xiv, 23, 51) attributes to him the whole sculpted decoration of the Temple of Artemis at Ephesus. These mentions are widely considered as dubious.

=== Roman copies ===
Besides these works, associated with Praxiteles by reference to notices in ancient writers, there are numerous copies from the Roman age, statues of Hermes, Dionysus, Aphrodite, Satyrs and Nymphs, and the like, in which a varied expression of Praxitelean style may be discerned.

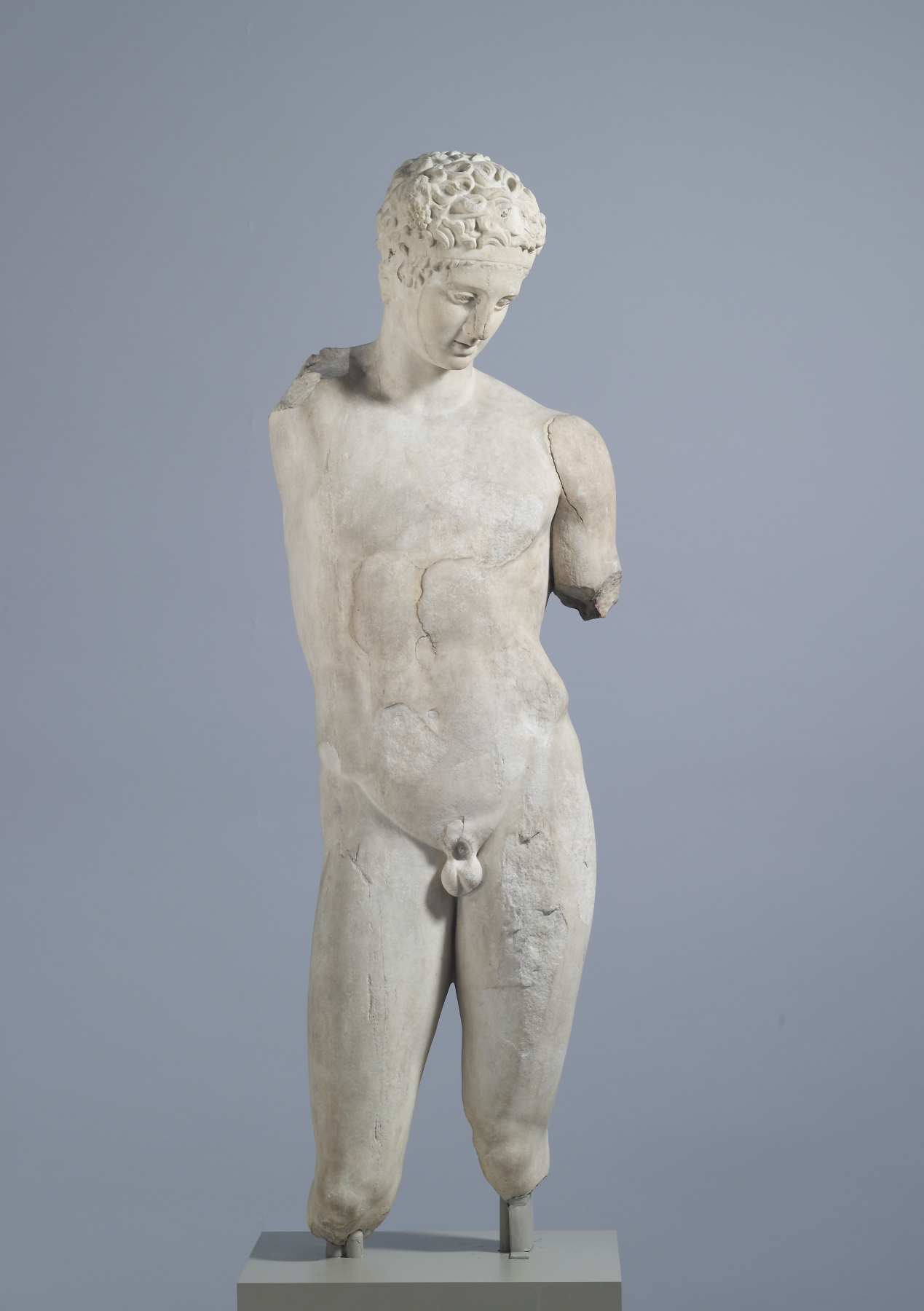
Satyr Pouring Wine, Roman copy after Praxiteles (c. 370–360 BC), Walters Art Museum, Baltimore

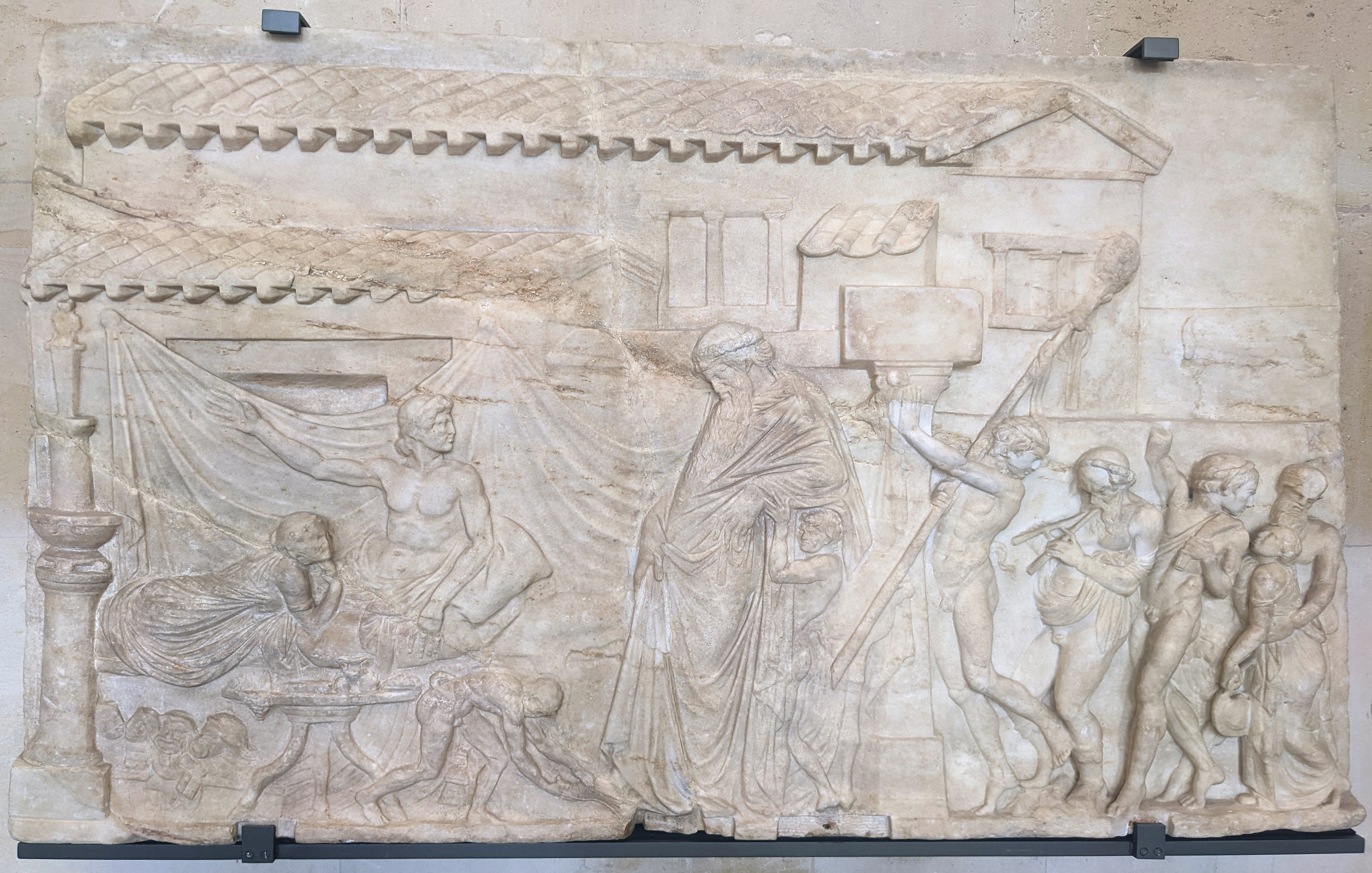
Icarus is visited by a drunken Dionysos and his entourage, Roman copy, 175–200, Louvre, Paris

== See also ==
- Marble sculpture
- Artistic canons of body proportion

== Bibliography ==
- Aileen Ajootian, "Praxiteles", Olga Palagia and J. J. Pollitt (eds.). Personal Styles in Greek Sculpture. Cambridge University Press, 1998 [1996], ISBN 0-521-65738-5, pp. 91–129.
- (in Italian) Antonio Corso, Prassitele: fonti epigrafiche e letterarie, vita e opere (three vols.). De Lucca, Rome 1988 and 1991, ISBN 88-7813-183-0 (entry at the Open Library).
- (in French) Marion Muller-Dufeu, La Sculpture grecque. Sources littéraires et épigraphiques. Éditions de l'École nationale supérieure des Beaux-Arts (Coll. Beaux-Arts histoire), Paris 2002, ISBN 2-84056-087-9, p. 481–521 (=new edition of Johannes Overbeck, Antike Schiftquellen, Leipzig 1868; see also Der neue Overbeck (English summary), project website (in German) of Freie Universität Berlin).
- (in French) Alain Pasquier and Jean-Luc Martinez, Praxitèle, catalogue of the exhibition at the Louvre Museum, March 23-June 18, 2007, Louvre editions and Somogy, Paris 2007, ISBN 978-2-35031-111-1.
- Brunilde Ridgway, Fourth-Century Styles in Greek Sculpture, University of Wisconsin Press, Madison 1997 ISBN 0-299-15470-X, pp. 258–267.
- (in French) Claude Rolley, La Sculpture grecque II : la période classique, Picard, coll. « Manuels d'art et d'archéologie antiques », 1999 (ISBN 2-7084-0506-3), pp. 242–267.
- Andrew Stewart, Greek Sculpture: An Exploration, Yale University Press, New Haven & London 1990, ISBN 0-300-04072-5, pp. 277–281.
