= Apollo Sauroktonos =

1st - 2nd century AD Roman sculptures

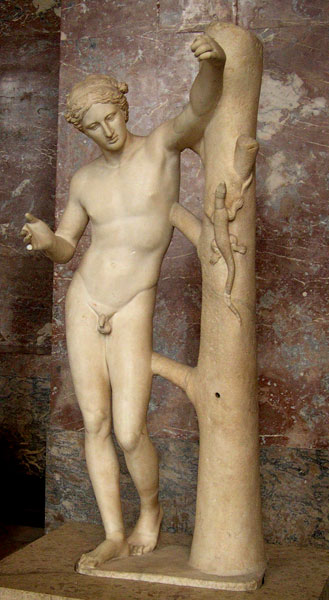
The Apollo Sauroktonos, Louvre Museum version

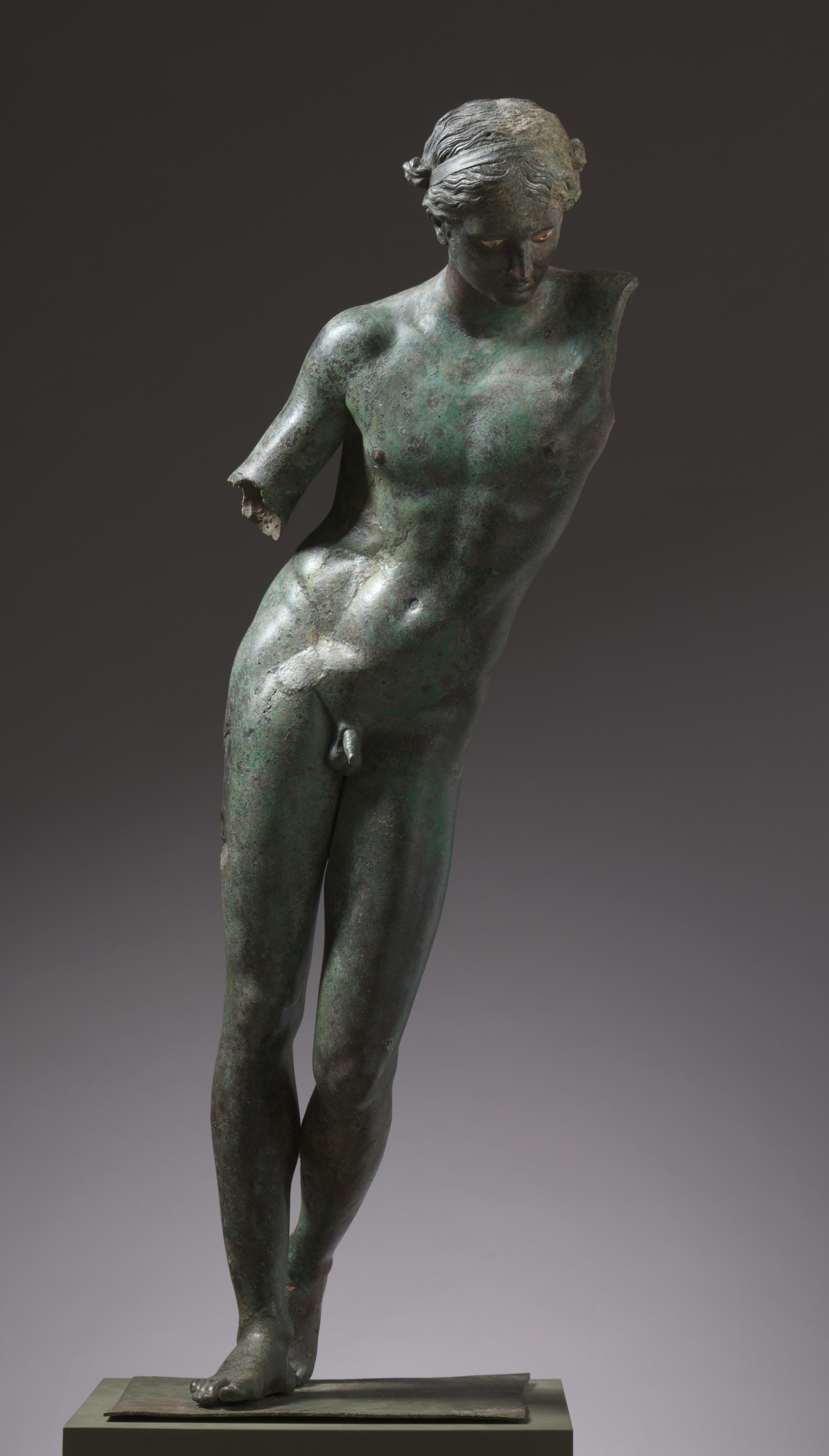
Apollon Sauroctonos, bronze from the Cleveland Museum of Art

Apollo Sauroktonos (Attic Greek: Άπόλλων Σαυροκτόνος) (Apollo Lizard-killer) is the title of several 1st – 2nd century AD Roman marble copies of an original by the ancient Greek sculptor Praxiteles. The statues depict a nude adolescent Apollo about to catch a lizard climbing up a tree. Copies are included in the collections of the Louvre Museum, the Vatican Museums, and the National Museums Liverpool.

== Original ==
The bronze original of this sculpture is attributed by Pliny (XXXIV, 69-70) to the Athenian sculptor Praxiteles and is usually dated to c.350-340 BC. Martial wrote an epigram about the statue (14, 172): "Spare the lizard, treacherous boy, creeping toward you; it desires to perish by your hands." The Cleveland Museum of Art claims to own a bronze original (or part-original) of this work. The work is currently being analyzed to verify this claim by scholars and archaeologists. Greece has raised questions about ownership and title.

== Copies ==
About forty copies of the Apollo Sauroctonos are known to exist. It is also depicted on Roman gems and coins.

A marble copy of the Apollo Sauroctonos is in the collection of the Louvre, with the catalogue number MR 78 (n° usuel Ma 441). It is 1.67 metres (5.5 ft) high, and the left arm, the right hand and the lizard's head are modern restorations. Formerly in the Borghese collection, it was bought by Napoleon in 1807. Other copies are in the collections of the Vatican Museums, Villa Albani, and National Museums Liverpool. One example, albeit headless was found in the ancient sp of San Casciano dei Bagni (Italy)

== Iconography ==
The statue depicts Apollo as a youth, unusually for classical artwork which normally did not portray gods other than Dionysus and Eros as children or adolescents. Martin Robertson has suggested that the statue alludes to the myth of Apollo slaying the serpent Python. Jenifer Neils disputes this, noting that Python is depicted elsewhere in Greek art as a giant snake, and there is no reason to believe that ancient audiences would have associated the small lizard depicted on the Apollo Sauroctonos with Python. Alternatively, the statue may depict Apollo healing the lizard, related to a myth that the lizard, when it loses its sight, is healed by looking at the sun.
