= Resting Satyr =

Greek sculpture

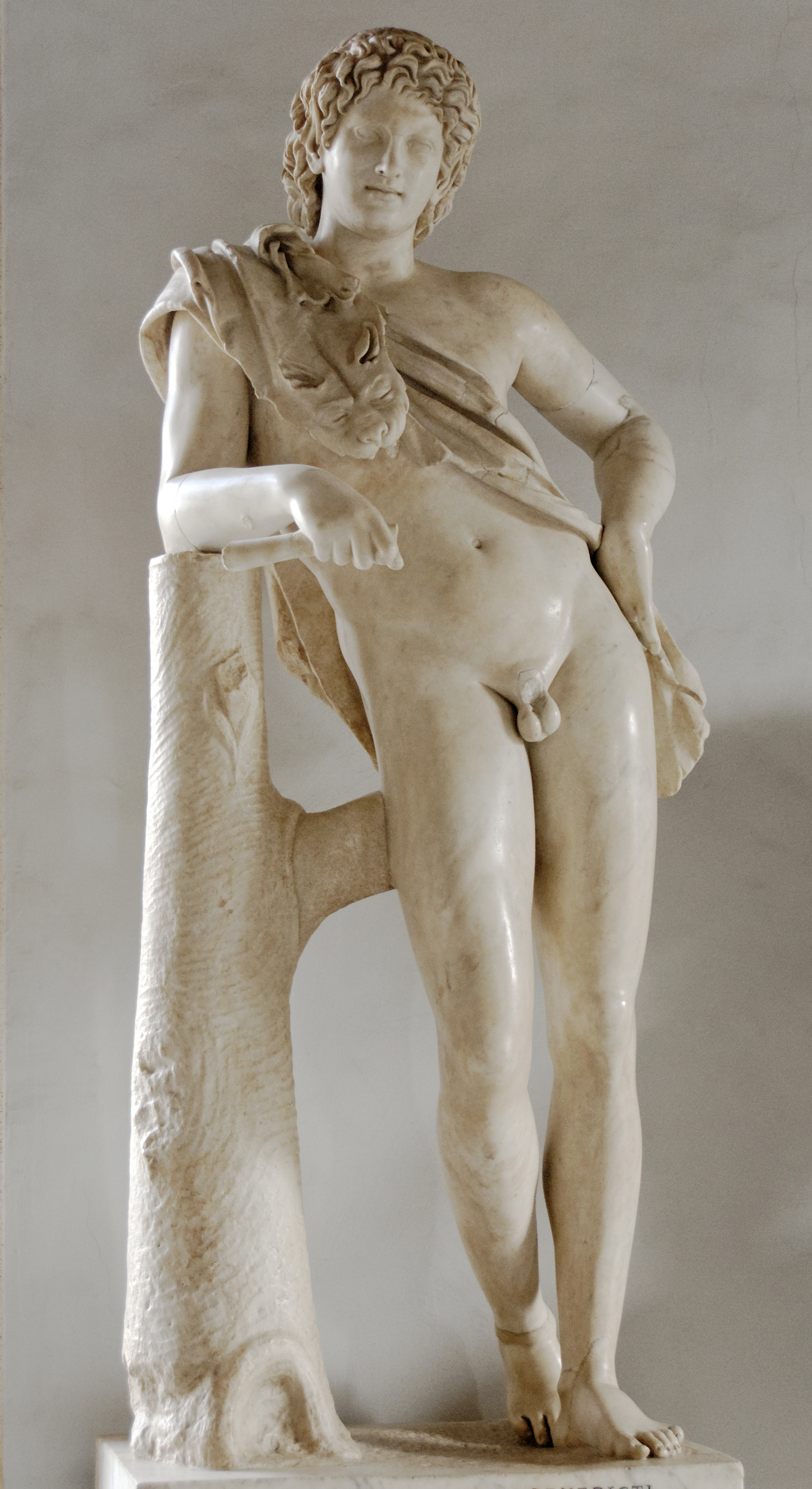
Capitoline Faun, exemplar from the Capitoline Museums, c. 130 AD (inv. 739)

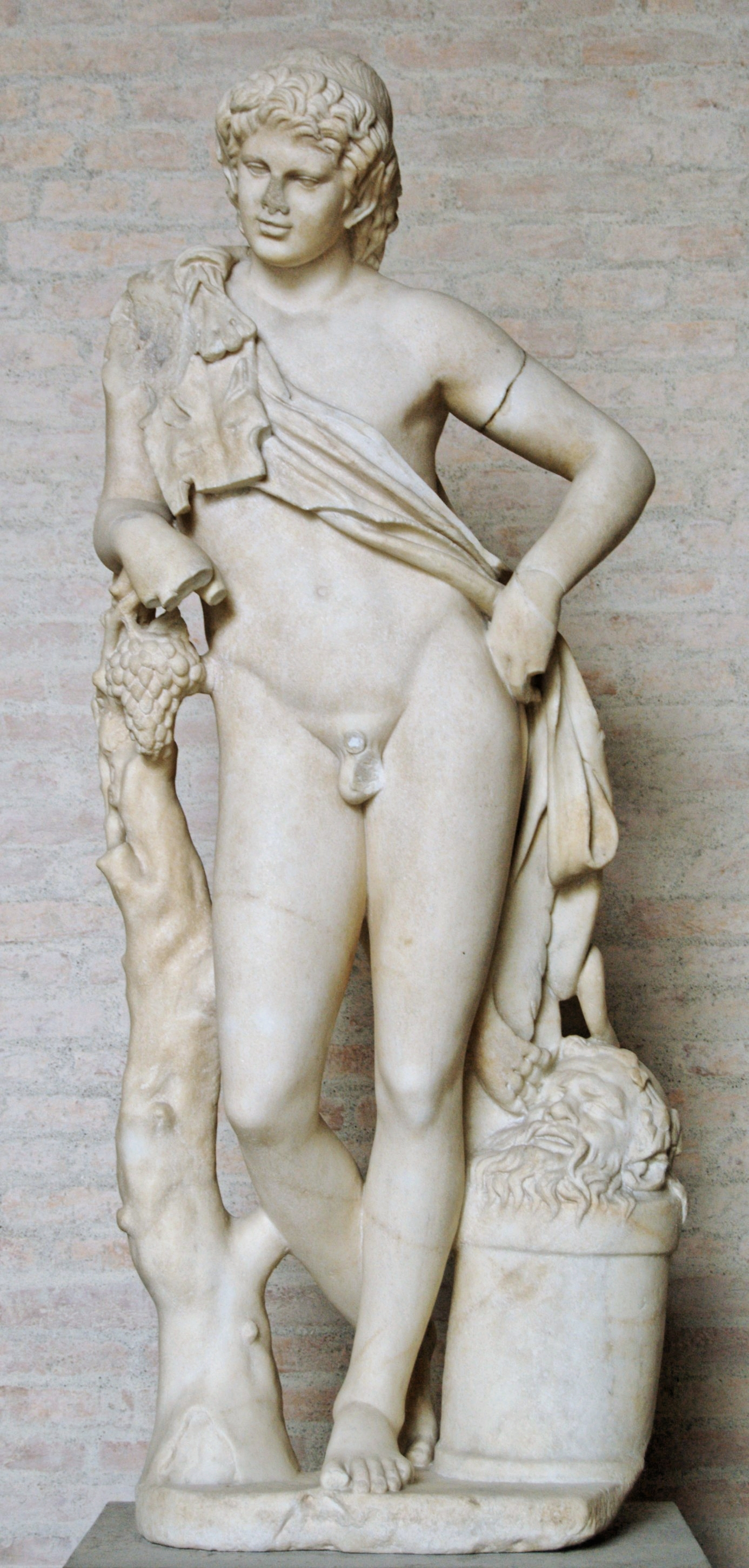
Ruspoli Faun, Munich Glyptothek (inv. 228)

The Resting Satyr or Leaning Satyr, also known as the Satyr anapauomenos (in ancient Greek ἀναπαυόμενος, from ἀναπαύω / anapaúô, to rest) is a statue type generally attributed to the ancient Greek sculptor Praxiteles. Some 115 examples of the type are known, of which the best known is in the Capitoline Museums.

== Description ==
The Resting Satyr statue type shows a youthful satyr, sometimes referred to as a faun, who is identifiable by his clearly pointed ears and the Pardalide (panther pelt) worn across his torso or placed on a post near the satyr. The satyr rests his right elbow on a tree trunk, in a relaxed pose, supported only on his left leg. His right leg is bent, with his right foot just touching his left heel. In a number of examples, a restorer has added an attribute held in the right hand, often a flute or Pan pipes, while the left hand is on the left hip holding down the pelt. The facial features are well defined and the nose slightly upturned. The hair is often heavy, curled, and held by a cord or a crown. According to E.M. Hurll, the Resting Satyr was originally displayed at the streets Tripods in Athens. As this is thought to be one of many satyr types produced by Praxiteles, this sculptures defining features are the relaxed s-shaped slant of the body as well as relaxed pose of the arms characteristic of the artist's work.

== Satyr origin and iconography ==
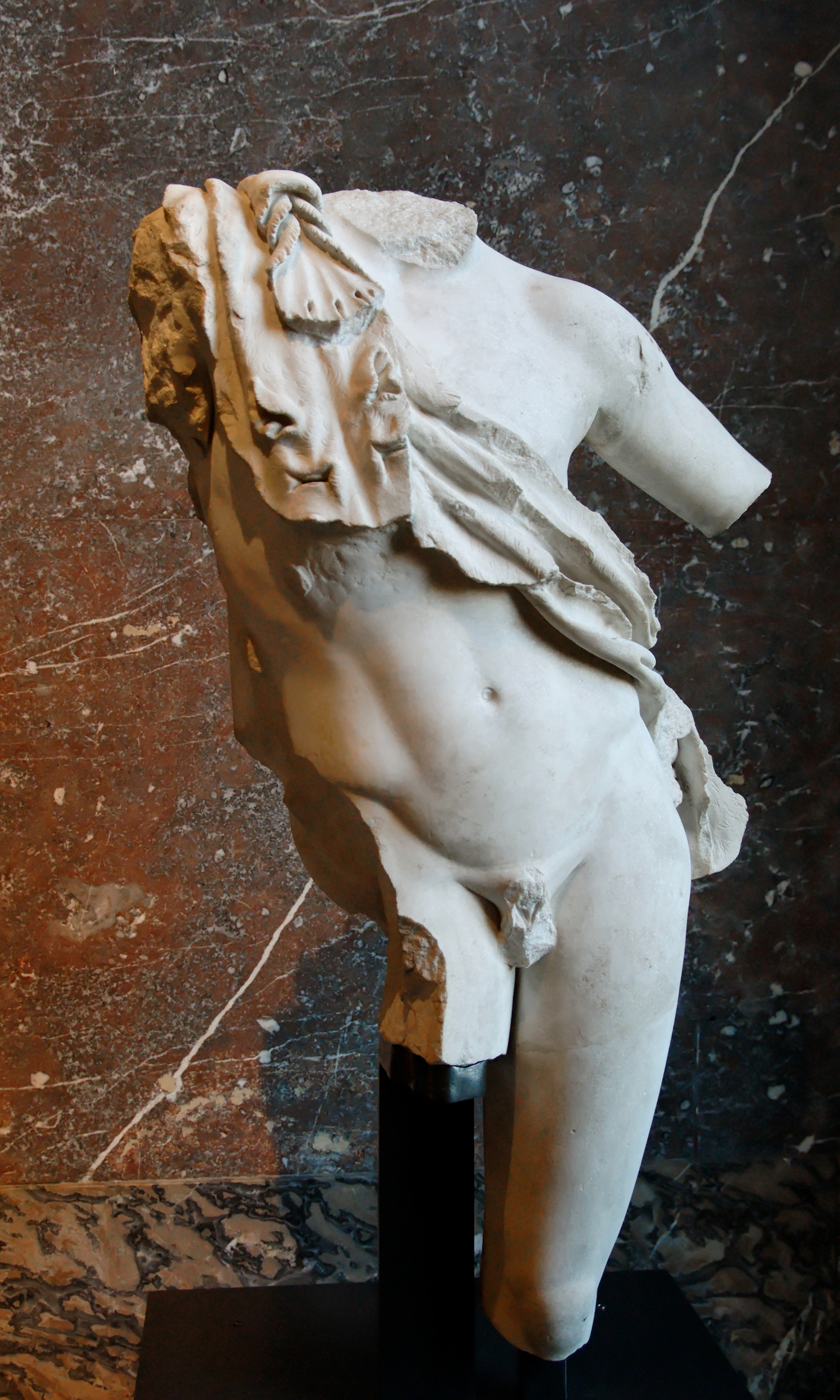
Farnese Faun, Louvre (Ma 664)

In ancient Greek mythology, satyrs are male companions to Dionysus, the god of grape harvest, ritual madness, theatre, and fertility. As followers of Dionysus, satyrs are known for their love of wine, women, and playing music on their pipes or flutes. Famous satyrs in mythology include Silenus, a satyr nurse to Dionysus and a demi-god of excessive drunkenness and Tityri, a flute-playing satyr in the train of Dionysus. Satyrs are referenced in The Homeric Hymns, Aesop's Fables, The Orphic Hymns, Ovid's Metamorphoses and Fasti, and Virgil's Georgics.

In early Greek art, satyrs were often portrayed as rugged, older, and ugly in art. The artist Praxiteles is credited with creating a softer and youthful satyr type in his sculptures. The presence of the panther pelt on the Satyr signifies their connection to their beastly animal nature. Satyrs were also often depicted on pottery as nude with an erect phallus to imply their savage and brutish sexual nature. The iconography involving their sexual nature did not carry over into the medium of sculpture. Satyrs are often depicted with musical instruments, usual a flute or pipes. The inclusion of musical instruments solidifies the satyr's connection with Dionysus and his festivities.

== Attribution ==
The Resting Satyr is traditionally identified as the "satyr periboêtos" mentioned by Pliny the Elder in his Natural History XXXIV, 69:

[Praxiteles produced in bronze] a Liber Pater, and a famous Drunkard, and a satyr that the Greeks call periboêtos
(et Liberum patrum Ebriatem nobilemque una satyrum quem Græci periboeton cognominant)

Since Winckelmann this word has traditionally been translated as "famous". This celebrity explains the large number of examples of this type, one of the most popular in the Mediterranean: just under 115 have been found, including 15 from Rome, four from North Africa, eight from Greece, two from Spain, and one from Gaul. According to H.S. Jones, there is no documented motive for the creation of this statue type but infers that the motive was most likely purely artistic.

The resting satyr type is just one of the satyr types attributed to Praxiteles. The pouring satyr type is the other most common satyr type attributed to him. The resting satyr type and pouring satyr type share much of the same satyr iconography including references to their relationship with Dionysus. The pouring satyr type depicts the satyr with one arm raised above their head with a pouring vessel. The difference in pose is the most notable difference between the two types.

== Other known copies ==
According to KJ. Hartswick, two copies of Praxiteles Resting Satyr were found in the Gardens of Sallust where there were several other Dionysiac sculptures. Another copy of the statue was found at the Villa Borghese and was initially mistaken as a sculpture of Dionysus. One-fifth of the approximately 115 surviving copies are miniatures. Compared to the large scale copies of this sculpture, the miniatures have a lack of uniformity in proportions.

- Resting Satyr. Roman artwork sculpted in marble between 150 and 175 CE, in Prado Museum, Spain.
- Resting Satyr. Roman copy after the mid-4th century B.C, marble, height 168 cm, in Hermitage Museum, Russia.
- Resting Satyr (Satyrus anapauomenos). Roman copy of the 2nd century CE, in Hermitage Museum, Russia. Inv. No. Гр. 3058 / A.154.
- Resting Satyr, 2nd century AD, Royal Castle, Warsaw, Poland.
- Resting Satyr, Roman copy of the 2nd century, marble, height 180 cm, in Ny Carlsberg Glyptotek, Copenhagen, Denmark. Inv. No. 474.
- Resting Satyr, Roman copy, first half of the 2nd cent. Carrara marble, height (without pedestal) 1.78 m, width of the statue 0.76 m, height of the pedestal 0.08 m., Santa Maria Capua Vetere, Archaeological Museum of ancient Capua, Italy.
- Capitoline Faun, 19th Century Italian Bronze Statue, Benedetto Boschetti, 28-1/2 inches (72.4 cm) high on 7 inches (17.7 cm) high marble base.

== Mentions in literature ==
American novelist Nathaniel Hawthorne's 1860 Gothic novel, The Marble Faun, centers on Donatello, a man who is believed to be a descendant of Praxiteles’ Marble Faun due to his uncanny resemblance to the sculpture. The novel was inspired by Hawthorne's visit to the Palazzo Nuovo of the Capitoline Museum in Rome after moving his family to Italy in 1858. This novel was later adapted into a 1996 opera, with music by Ellen Bender and a libretto by Jessica Treadway.

== Examples ==
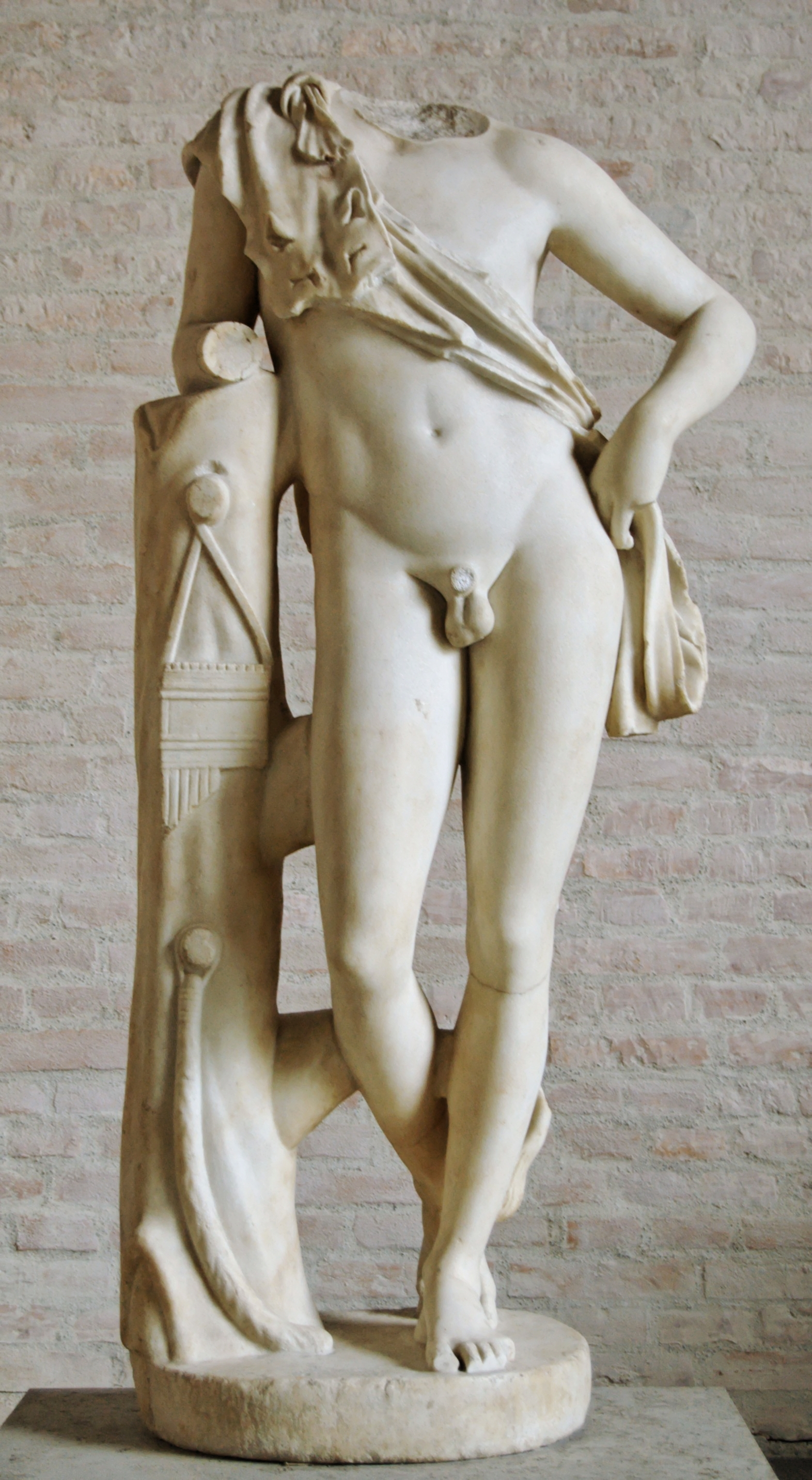
Ruspoli Faun, Munich Glyptothek (inv. 229)

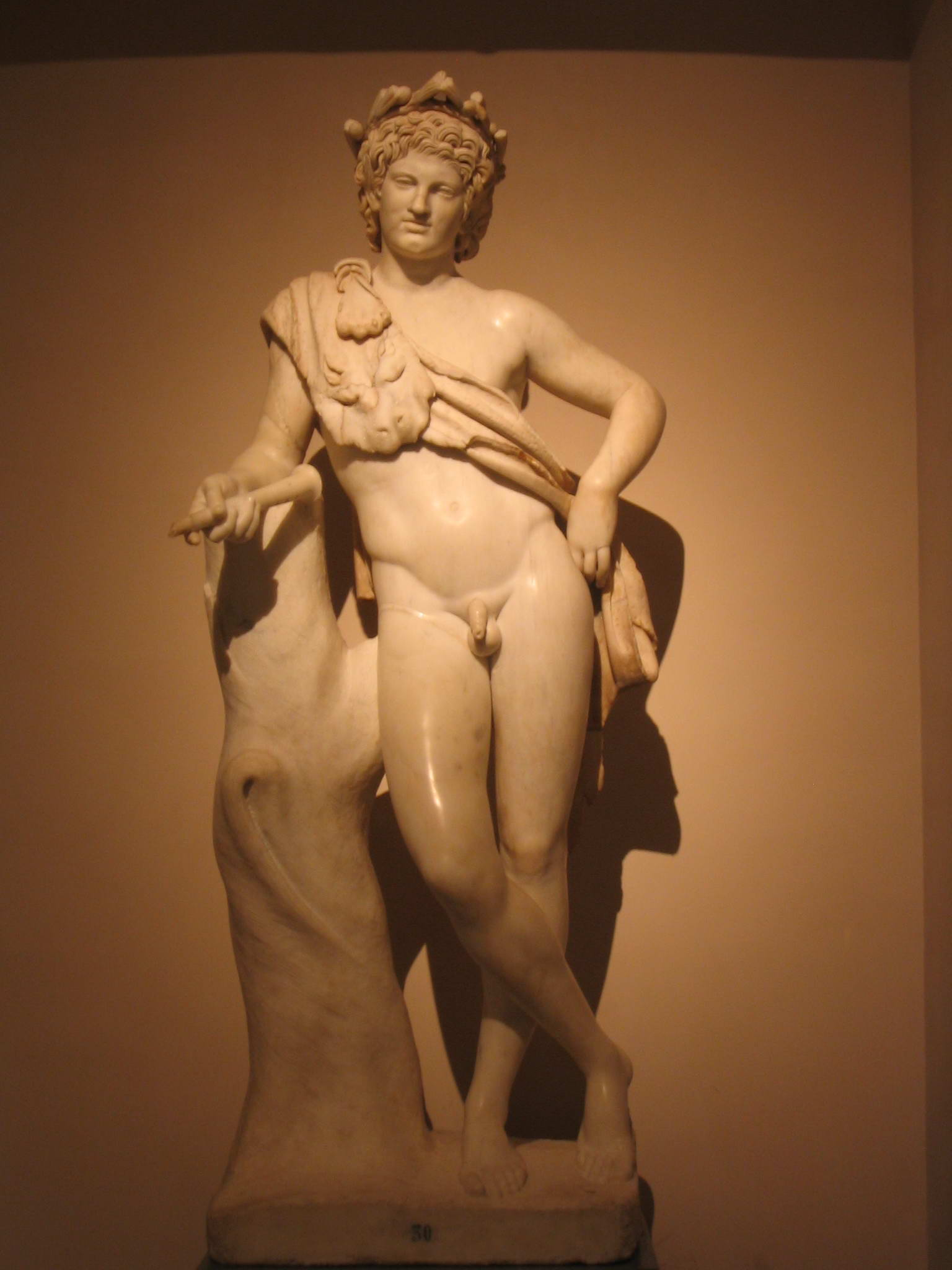
Resting Satyr, Prado Museum

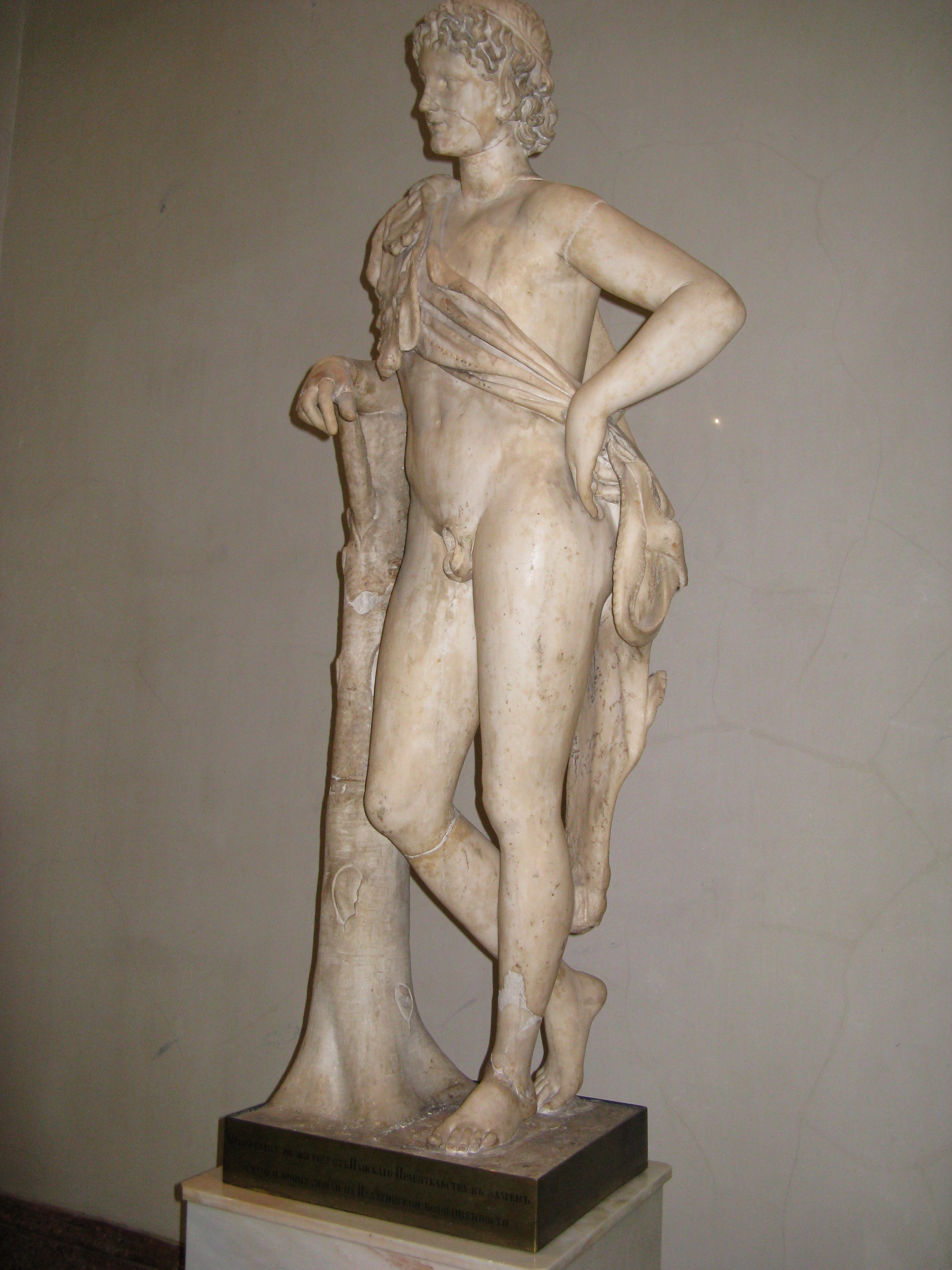
Resting Satyr, Hermitage Museum

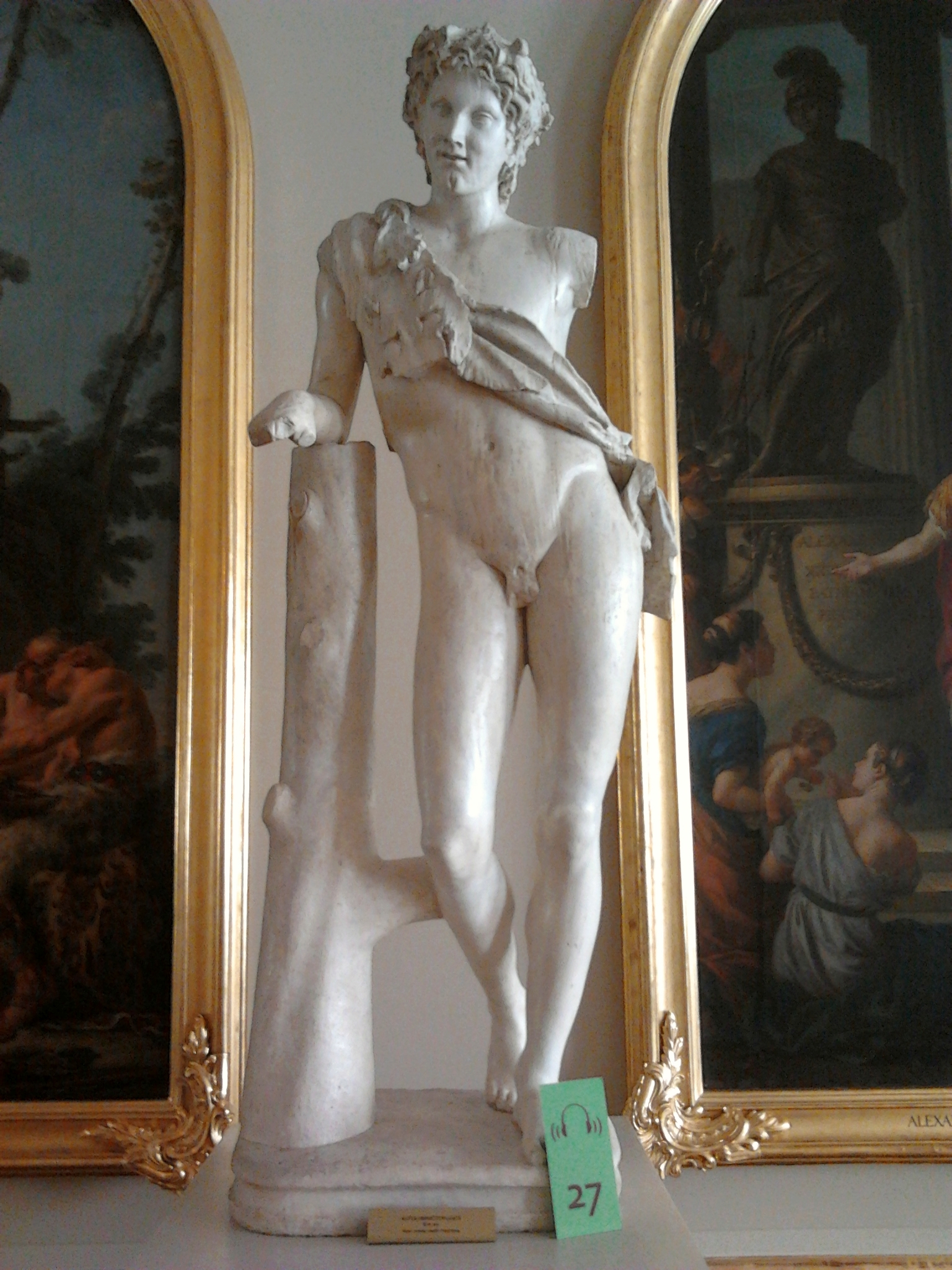
Resting Satyr, 2nd century AD, Royal Castle, Warsaw, Poland

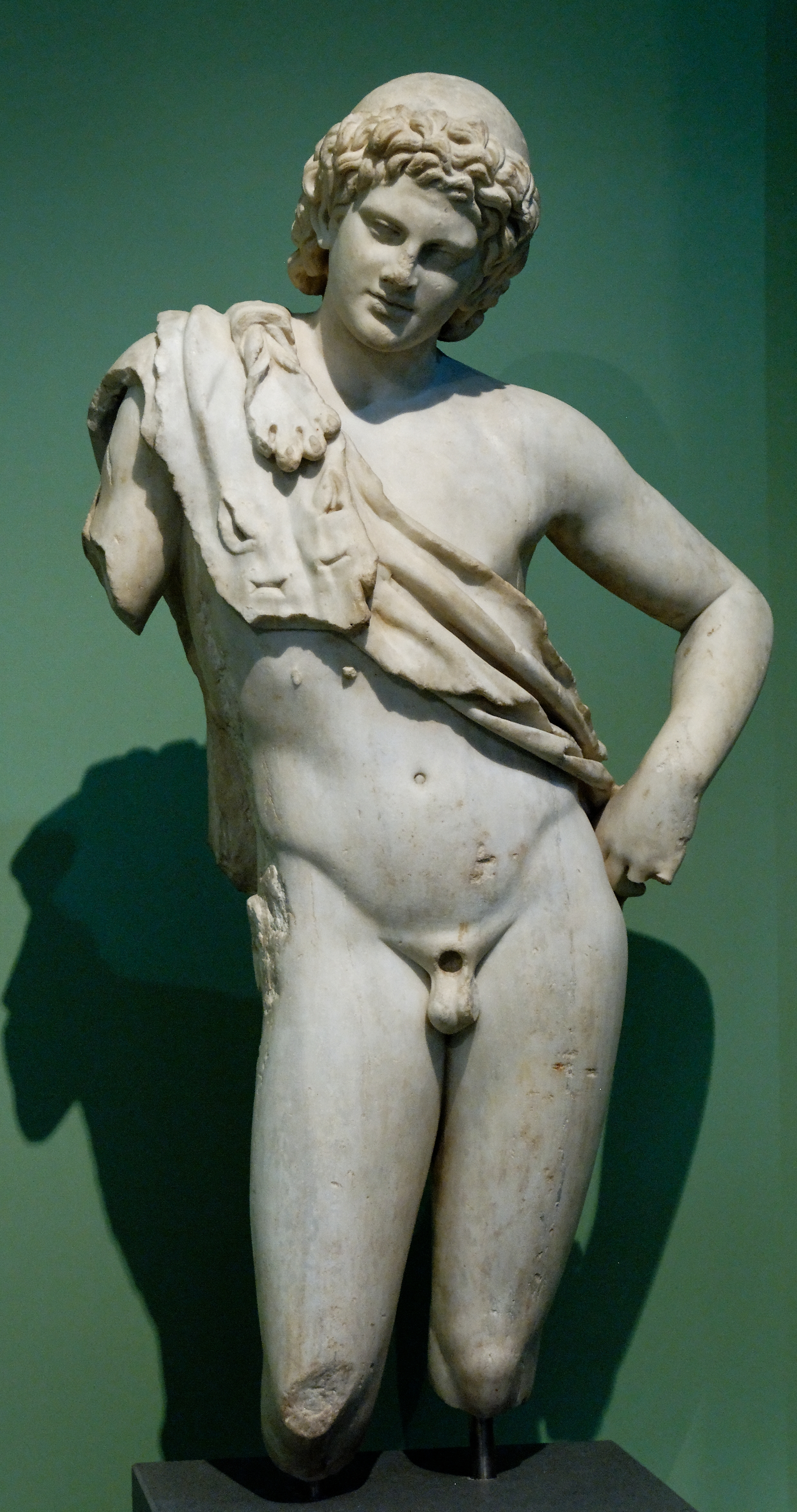
Satyr Anapauomenos, Centrale Montemartini, Capitoline Museums, Italy

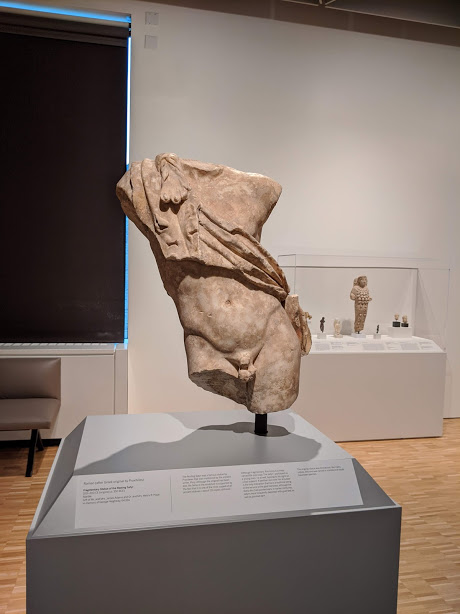
Fragmentary Roman marble copy of the Resting Satyr in the Eskenazi Museum of Art

== Bibliography ==
- Elisabeth Bartman, "Ancient Sculptural Copies in Miniature", Columbia Studies in the Classical Tradition, vol. 19, Brill, Leyde, New York and Cologne, 1992 ISBN 978-90-04-09532-8.
- Francis Haskell and Nicholas Penny, Taste and the Antique, Yale University Press, New Haven and London, 1981, p36.
- (in French) Jean-Luc Martinez, "Les satyres de Praxitèle", in Praxitèle, Louvre exhibition catalogue, éditions du Louvre & Somogy, 2007, ISBN 978-2-35031-111-1, p. 236-291.
- Brunilde Sismondo Ridgway, Fourth-Century Styles in Greek Sculpture, University of Wisconsin Press, Madison, 1997 (ISBN 0-299-15470-X), p. 265-267.
- (in German) Barbara Vierneisel-Schlörb, Glyptothek München. Katalog der Skulpturen, p32, p. 353-369.
