= Aberdeen Head =

Ancient Greek statue

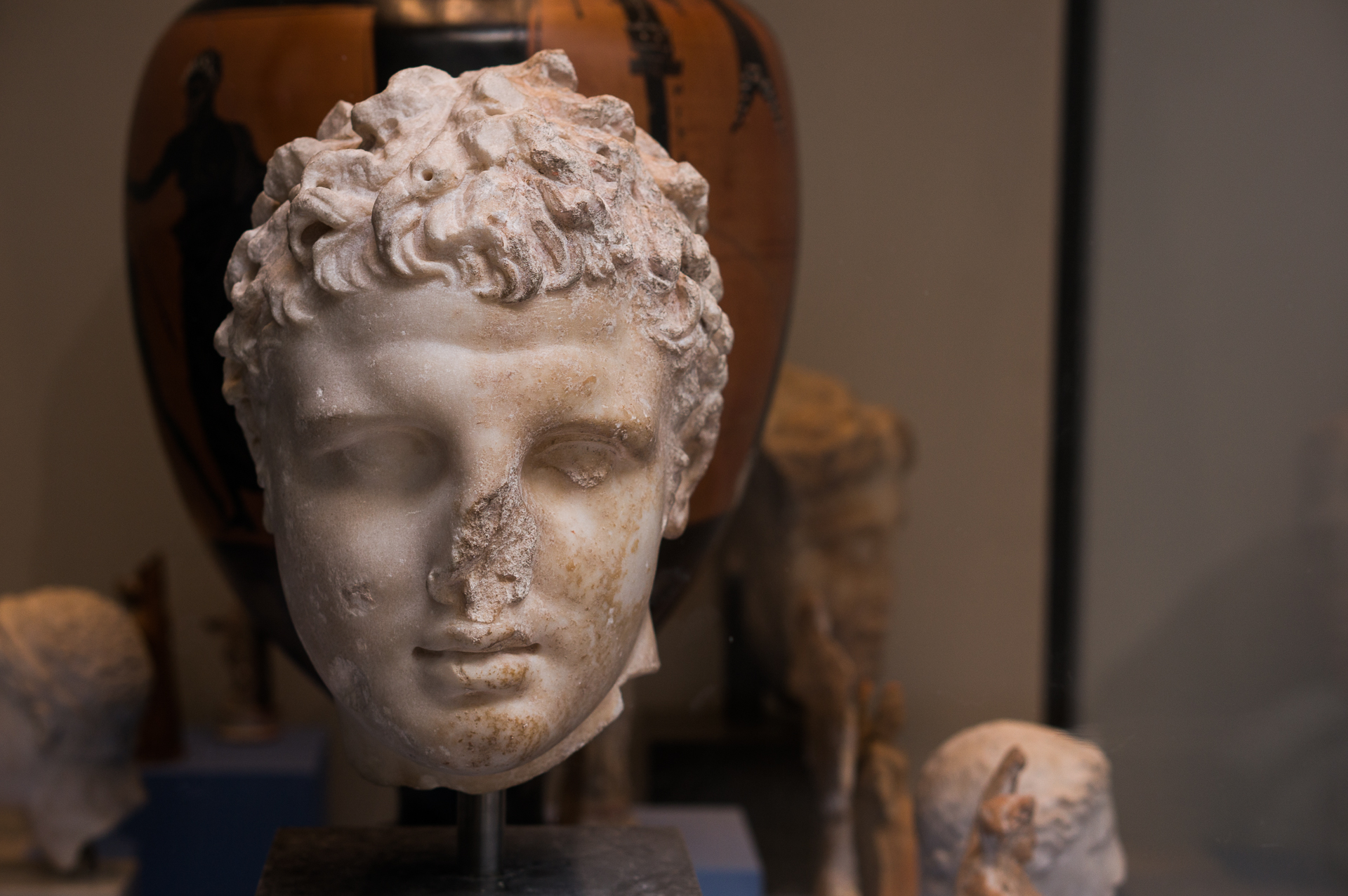
- Aberdeen Head
- Material: Marble
- Size: 35cm high, 25cm wide
- Created: 325-280 BC
- Present location: British Museum, London
- Registration: 1862,0817.1

The Aberdeen Head is a rare, original Greek head of a young male, possibly an athlete, that is named after its first owner, the Earl of Aberdeen. Now in the British Museum, it a good example of Hellenistic sculpture from 3rd Century BC.

== Description ==
The Aberdeen Head, whether of Hermes or of a youthful Heracles is linked to Praxiteles by its striking resemblance to the Hermes of Olympia. Dated between 325 and 280 BC, the statue, of which only the head is extant, would have been crowned with a metal wreath in his hair, for which the dowel holes survive.

== Provenance ==
The statue originates from an unknown findspot in Greece before it was acquired by George Hamilton Gordon, 4th Earl of Aberdeen. It was purchased by the British Museum in 1862 in a sale from Argyll House, the ancestral home of the Dukes of Argyll.
