= Campo Iemini Venus =

Statue of Venus (modest Venus)

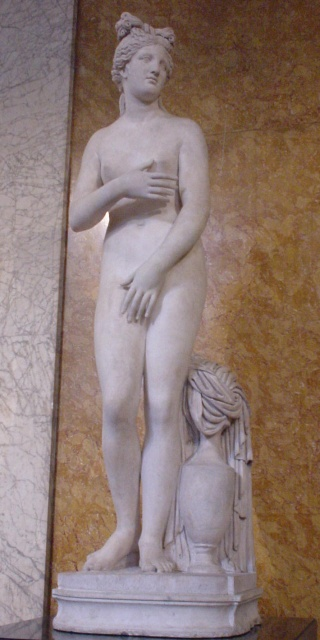
The Campo Iemini Venus (British Museum)

The Campo Iemini Venus is a marble sculpture of the Venus Pudica/Capitoline Venus type. It was unearthed in the spring of 1792 among other sculptures in the excavation of a Roman villa at Campo Iemini, near Torvaianica, in Lazio (illustration, left). The dig was directed by the English dealer in Roman antiquities Robert Fagan (1761-1816) under the patronage of Prince Augustus, the Duke of Sussex in partnership with Sir Corbet Corbet (British Museum). At the time of its discovery the English in particular found it superior to the Capitoline Venus. After restoration in Rome it was shipped to London, where Prince Augustus gave it to his brother the Prince Regent, who set it up at Carlton House. After his death, when Carlton House was replaced by a terrace of houses, William IV donated it to the British Museum.
