= Aphrodite of Menophantos =

Statue of Venus (modest Venus)

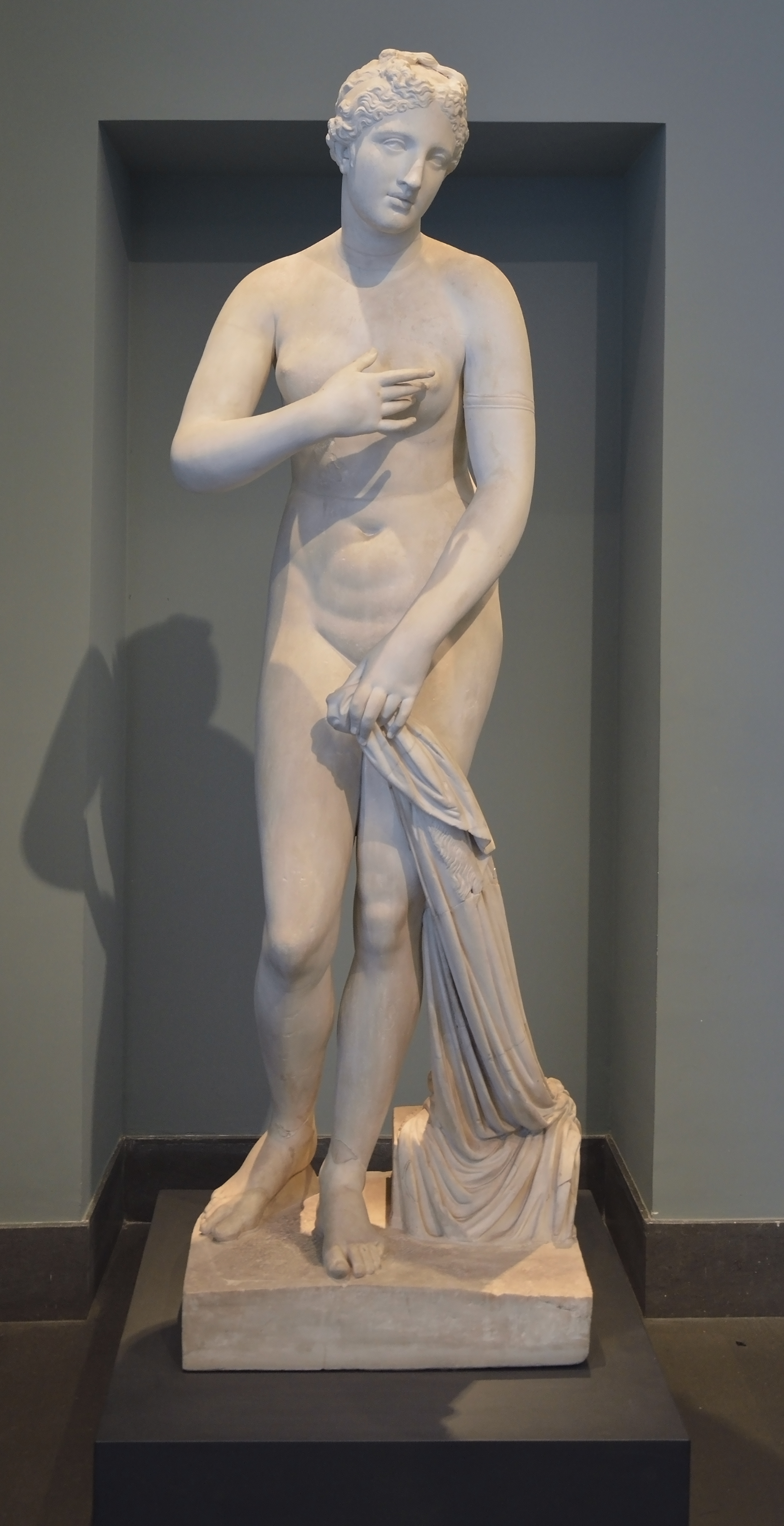
Aphrodite of Menophantos a Venus Pudica signed by Menophantos, first century BCE, found at San Gregorio al Celio, Rome (Museo Nazionale Romano)

The Aphrodite of Menophantos is a Roman marble statue of the goddess Venus. Its design takes the form of "Venus Pudica", based on another statue, the Capitoline Venus. It was found at the Camaldolese monastery of San Gregorio al Celio in Rome, and is now in the Palazzo Massimo alle Terme, Rome. It bears the signature of Menophantos, ("ἀπὸ τῆc / ἐν Τρῳάδι / Ἀφροδίτηc / Μηνόφαντοc / ἐποίε") a Greek sculptor, apparently of the 1st century BCE, of whom nothing more is known.

== The pudica posture ==
The Venus Pudica is a classic pose in Western art. In the Aphrodite of Menophantos, the statue features an unclothed female with her left hand pulling a cloth over her genitalia whilst her right covers her breasts. The goddess stands on her left leg while her right one is slightly inclined. She turns slightly to her left; her tilted head and nonchalant expression suggest that she is lost in thought. The term Pudica derives from the Latin word "pudendus" which "can mean either external genitalia or shame, or both simultaneously"; and also from the double meaning of the Greek root word "aidos" ("Αἰδώς"), which means shame or reverence.

== Discovery and subsequent history ==
The Camaldolese monks occupied the ancient church and monastery of S. Gregorii in Clivo Scauri. It was founded on the slope (clivus) of the Caelian Hill by Pope Gregory the Great around 580. The monastery, formerly the villa of his patrician family, was dedicated in honour of the apostle Andrew. By the 10th century Gregory's name was appended to that of the apostle, and eventually replaced it. The sculpture came into the possession of prince Chigi. Johann Winckelmann described this sculpture in his Geschichte der Kunst des Altertums (vol V, ch. II).

== Shame vs sexuality ==
Recent scholars such as Christine Mitchell Havelock have argued that statues with the Pudica posture illustrated a feminine sexuality rooted in passivity, vulnerability, and shame. The hand covering her pudenda may be regarded as an act of external control in ancient Greek mythology and philosophy. For example, Aristotle writes of the concept of sophrosyne or the "soundness of mind" in his Rhetoric. "This quality was said to come from within a man, but had to be externally exerted from outside in a woman." In the Aphrodite of Menophantos, the hand may represent this external control.

== Autonomy vs dependence ==
However, some scholars argue that the drapery Aphrodite holds indicates her dependence of human form, as occurs in the east pediment of the Parthenon. According to Carpenter in the Bulletin of the Institute of Classical Studies, "the most brilliant features of the Parthenon sculptures is in the depiction of drapery ... Drapery became a means of both setting off and articulating the human form." Without drapery, the human body is unintelligible. In Aphrodite of Manophantos, the goddess' genitals are indeed covered, but its precise location and vitality are indicated by the converging drapery folds. Menophantos might be trying to demonstrate how the human form is overpowered, hidden and obscured under expressive lines or bulky drapery.

== Bath ==
Bernoulli argues that the hands and the drapery suggest that Aphrodite may be about to take a bath or has just finished bathing. In Aphrodite of Knidos, the drapery in her hand (plus the water jar at her feet) suggests that the goddess is about to step into a ritual bath. Therefore, the drapery in the Aphrodite of Manophantos may also suggest bathing. Since washing hands or immersion of the whole body had a widespread religious significance in classical antiquity and water was regarded as clean, fresh, and rejuvenating, the interpretation of bathing explains and justifies Aphrodite's nudity.

== Prohibition on seeing a nude goddess ==
Gerhart Rodenwaldt argued against the long-held view that the nudity of the Aphrodite of Menophantos should be explained in such human terms. Aphrodite is a divinity, not a mortal woman. He suggested that a goddess conveys a sense of sexuality by covering herself in order to maintain power. For example, Athena remains a virgin because she is placed within the masculine world of power: she plays a significant role in war and the protection of cities. Moreover, mortals are not allowed to see nude goddesses; doing so would result in dire consequences. In Hymn 5 by Callimachus, Athena states the problem clearly: "Whoever sees one of the immortals at a moment not of their choosing, must pay dearly for the sight". Callimachus tells the story of a young man named Actaeon, who came upon the virgin Goddess Artemis while she was bathing. For punishment he was hacked to death by his own dogs. In the same Hymn, Teiresias is struck blind because he inadvertently sees Athena bathing in a mountain stream. Thus it is possible that Aphrodite in this statue conceals her nudity in order to protect herself from observers seeing her.
