= Borghese Venus =

Statue of Venus (modest Venus)

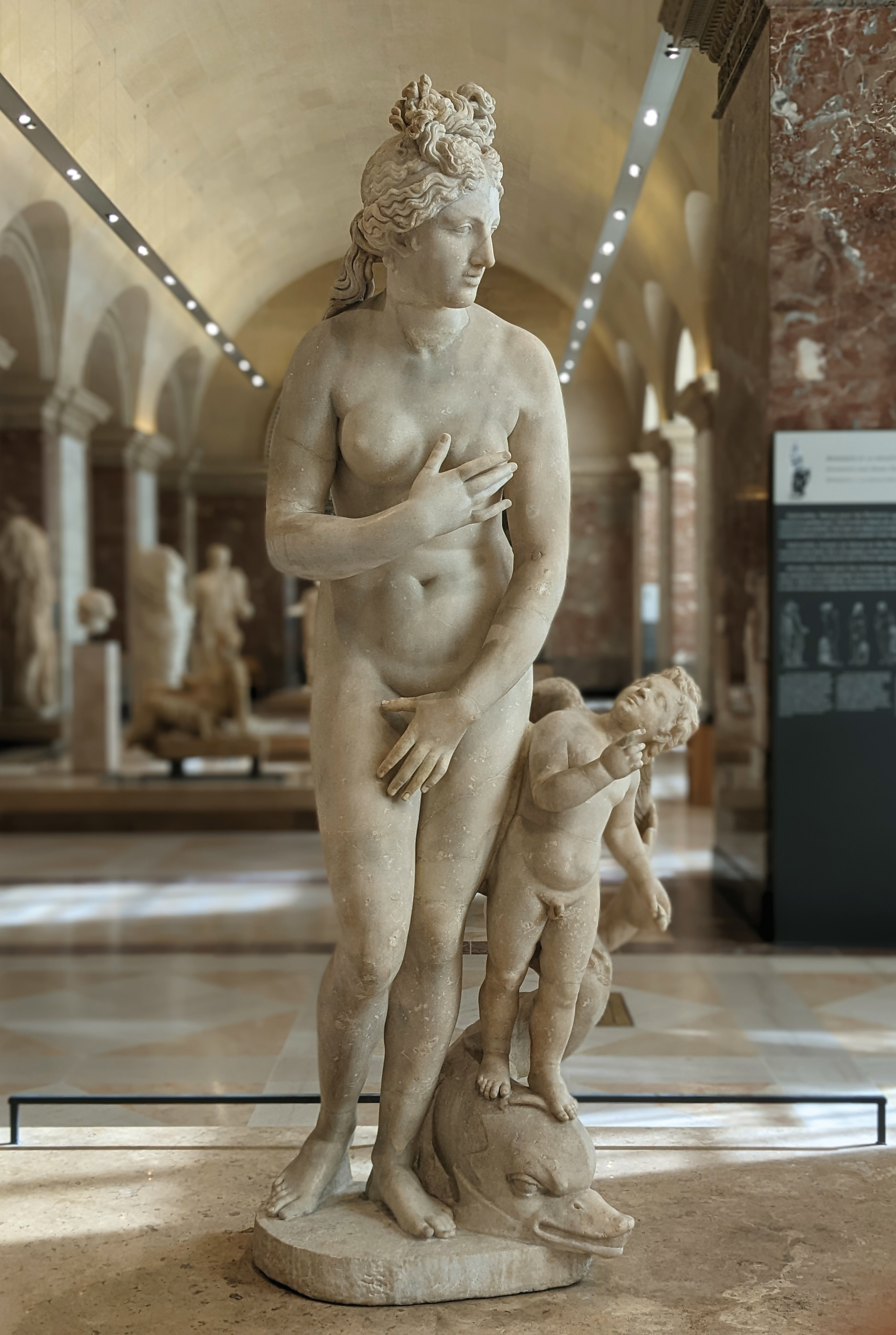
The Borghese Venus (Louvre)

Borghese Venus, 2nd century CE Roman marble copy of the Aphrodite of Cnidus (Capitoline Venus subtype). Once in the Borghese collection, it now resides in the Louvre Museum thanks to its purchase by Napoleon. The accompanying Cupid and dolphin are both classical attributes of Venus but are probably the addition of the Roman copyist. Its accession number is MR 369 (Ma 335).

== Other ancient Venuses at the Louvre ==
Three other Venuses were acquired from the Borghese collection at the same time, though the last two are far more restored than this example - 'Aphrodite at the pillar', an 'Armed Venus' and a Venus Pudica.
