= Venus Tauride =

Hellenistic sculpture held in St. Petersburg

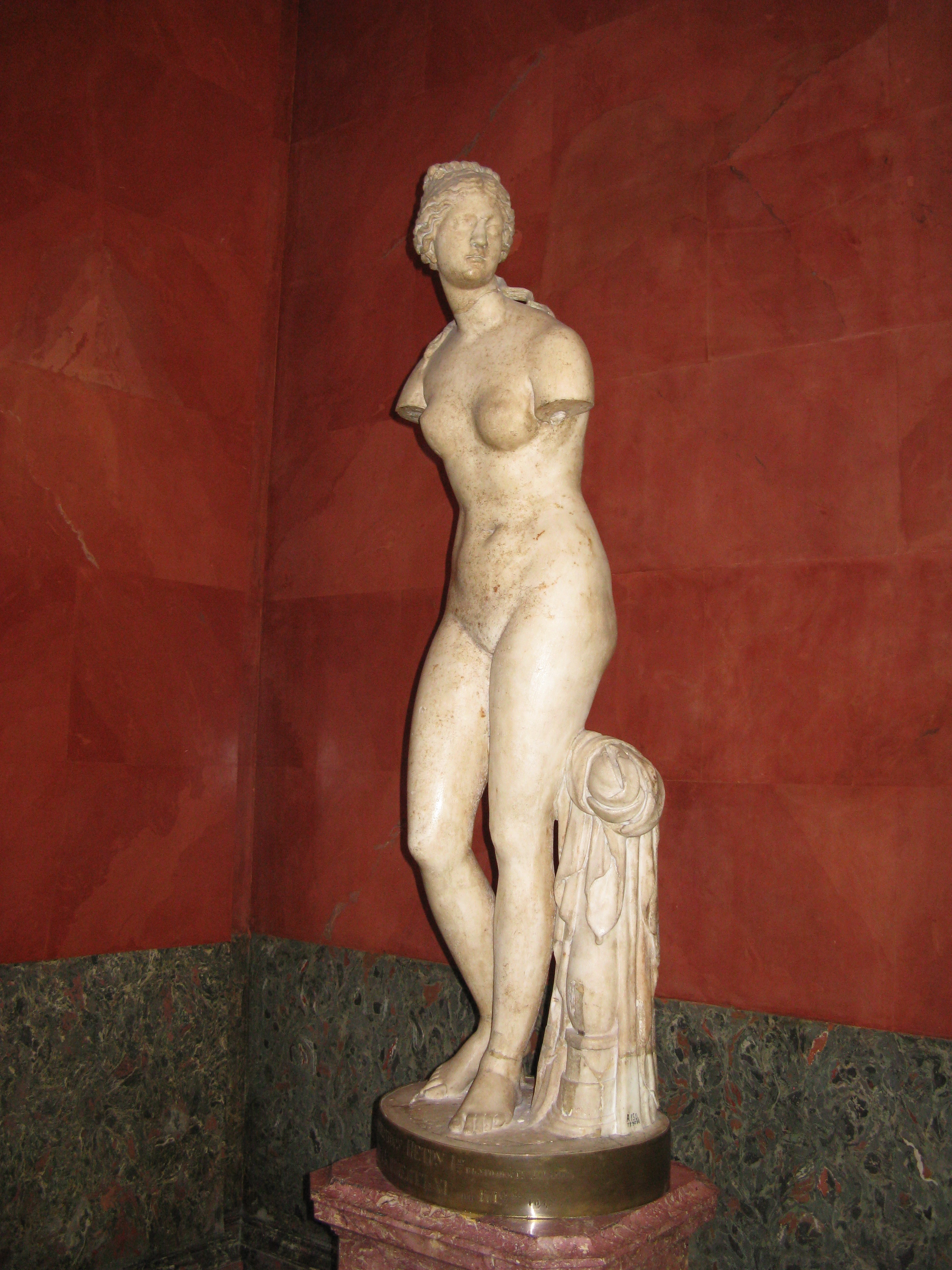
Venus Tauride

The Venus Tauride or Venus of Tauris is a 1.67 m high sculpture of Aphrodite. It is named after the Tauride (Tavrichesky) Palace in St Petersburg, where it was kept from the end of the eighteenth century until the mid-nineteenth. It is now in the Hermitage Museum.

It shows the goddess rising from her bath (with a column on the right on the piece, to her left-hand side, with her towel or clothing draped over it). It lost both arms in antiquity and her nose has been restored, but is otherwise complete (including an elaborate ancient hairstyle popular amongst classical upper-class women, with locks falling down onto her shoulders, and an original ankle bracelet on her left ankle).

It was thought to be a 2nd-century AD Roman copy from a Greek original, but recent research suggests it is in fact a Greek original dating from the 3rd or 2nd century BC. It is by an unknown sculptor, who takes inspiration from the Aphrodite of Cnidus (particularly of the Capitoline Venus type) but does not follow it strictly (the Tauride Venus, though well-proportioned and fully nude as in the exemplar, is slighter in build and of a more refined beauty than the exemplar).

It was ceded by Pope Clement XI to Peter I in Rome in 1718, after protracted diplomatic negotiations: though a peasant had offered it to the Czar's agent, the Pope had vetoed the exportation; he relented only when the Czar proposed to exchange it with the relics of Bridget of Sweden; they were in Revel, today called Tallinn, which the Russians had just conquered. On its arrival in Russia two years later it was the first classical sculpture to be seen in that country.
