= Colonna Venus =

Roman marble copy of Praxiteles sculpture

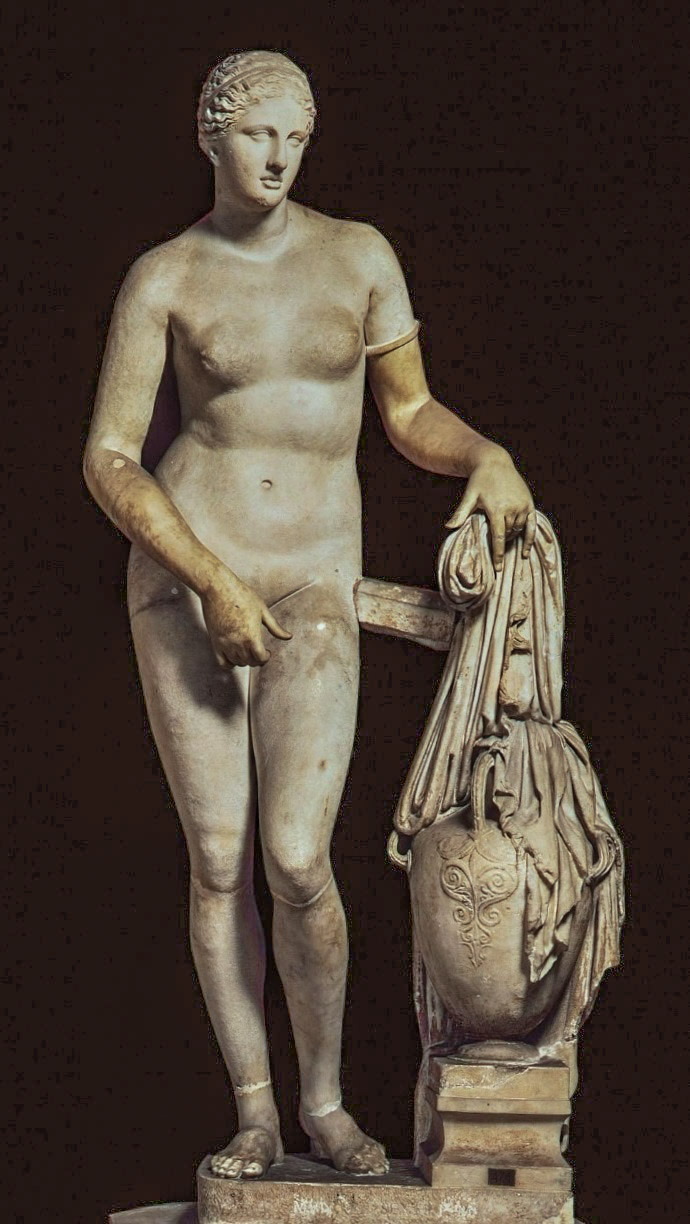
The Colonna Venus (Vatican Museums 812)

The Colonna Venus is a Roman marble copy of the lost Aphrodite of Cnidus sculpture by Praxiteles, conserved in the Museo Pio-Clementino as a part of the Vatican Museums' collections. It is now the best-known and perhaps most faithful Roman copy of Praxiteles's original.

The Colonna Venus is one of four marble Venuses presented in 1783 to Pope Pius VI by Filippo Giuseppe Colonna; this, the best of them, was published in Ennio Quirino Visconti's catalogue of the Museo Pio-Clementino, where it was identified for the first time as a copy of the Cnidian Venus. Immediately it eclipsed the somewhat flaccid variant of the same model that, as the Belvedere Venus, had long been in the Vatican collections. (Note: The Vatican Venus was first referred to in a document of 1536, as a recent gift to the Pope (Paul III Farnese from the Governor of Rome. Though provided with stucco drapery, it was removed from public view by Pope Gregory XIV, "nemico di ogni nuditá dell'arte" ["enemy of all nudity in art"] and placed in storage, all access to it forbidden; it remains in storage at the Vatican Museums today.) During the 19th and early 20th centuries, a prudish tin drape was modestly wrapped around the legs of the Colonna statue (Note: "by a misplaced sense of pretended decency" Adolf Michaelis wrote, in "The Cnidian Aphrodite of Praxiteles", The Journal of Hellenic Studies, 8 (1887), p 324.) – this was removed in 1932, when the statue was removed to the Gabinetto delle Maschere where it can be seen today.

When Christian Blinkenberg wrote the first modern monograph of the Cnidian Aphrodite in 1933, he found the Colonna Aphrodite and the Belvedere Aphrodite to most accurately reflect the original, mediated through a Hellenistic copy.

== Gallery ==
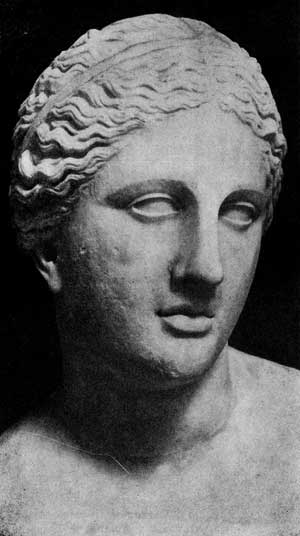
The Colonna Venus

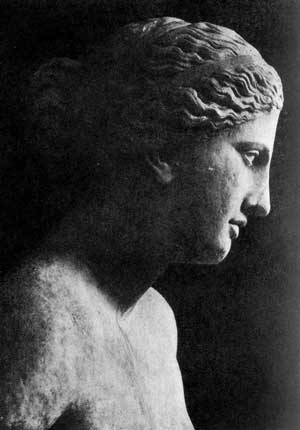
Colonna Venus: right side view

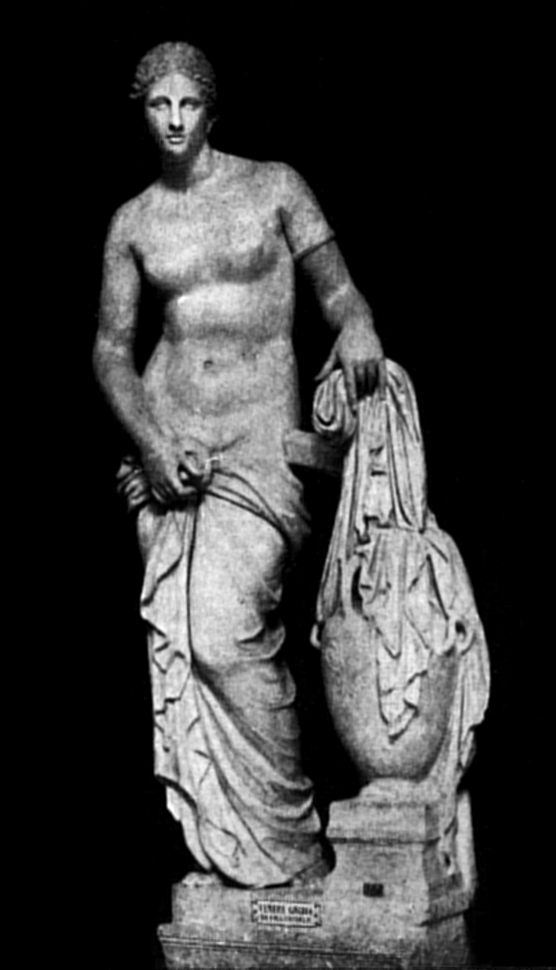
The Colonna Venus with its tin draperies, as it was displayed until 1932.

== Sources ==
- Haskell, Francis; Penny, Nicholas (1981). The most beautiful statues: the taste for antique sculpture: 1500-1900. Oxford: Ashmolean Museum. ISBN 9780900090837.

`
