= Amores (Lucian) =

Roman dialogue written in Ancient Greek

- by Lucian or Pseudo-Lucian
- Original title: Ἔρωτες
- Written: 2nd, 3rd or 4th century
- Country: Roman Empire
- Language: Ancient Greek

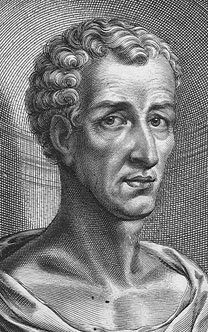
Lucian (fictional portrait). Engraving by the English painter William Faithorne.

The Erōtes (Ancient Greek: Ἔρωτες; "Loves", or "The two kinds of love"), also known as the Amores or Affairs of the Heart, is a dialogue written in the Roman Empire in Ancient Greek. It is an example of contest literature, comparing the love of women and the love of boys, and concluding that the latter is preferable over the former. The dialogue is traditionally attributed to the satirist Lucian and was transmitted as part of the corpus of his writings. Beginning in the early 20th century, some modern scholars have stated that the dialogue was probably not written by Lucian on account of its style, but others—including among those who do not vouch for its authenticity—have posited that the style resembles that of Lucian. As such, the work is normally cited under the name of Pseudo-Lucian, but acceptance of its authenticity has increased in the 2010s. The Erōtes is also famous for its vivid description of the Cnidian Aphrodite of Praxiteles.

The same subject is treated in the Amatorius of Plutarch and Leucippe and Clitophon by Achilles Tatius, but with the opposite conclusion in the former and with the latter reaching no verdict. In terms of structure, the dialogue may be considered similar to Plato's works, in which Socrates is often in contest with another man.

== Summary ==
The Amores begins as a dialogue between Lycinus and Theomnestus.

The second dialogue consists of a contest between Callicratidas and Charicles to decide which is the more desirable: the love for boys or the love for women (respectively).

== Authorship ==
The authorship of the work was first questioned in depth in an essay published in 1907 by a classicist named Robert Bloch. In the late 1990s, Judith Mossman, without weighing in explicitly on the authorship of the text, comments, however, that "many of the literary techniques employed are utterly typical of Lucian himself; if this work is by an imitator, (s)he was a very skillful one." James Jope, defending more explicitly the authenticity of the dialogue, states that it was common in Bloch's era to judge the authenticity of works of literature from classical antiquity "on tenuous grounds", adding that "critics sensitive to irony, ambivalence, and different authorial personae have a very different appreciation of Lucian than Bloch's generation". Like Bloch, Jope also performs an analysis of the vocabulary of the text, but contra Bloch, he shows that the words employed there, including the rarer and more idiosyncratic ones, previously exploited to deny Lucian's authorship, are actually found in other writings uncontroversially ascribed to him.

== Reception ==
For most of the twentieth century, the Amores was regarded as inauthentic and was not studied by many scholars. It was brought to renewed scholarly attention in 1984 when Michel Foucault examined the text in The History of Sexuality.

== Translations ==
- Amores (English only, Loeb version)
- Erotes (Greek original and Danish translation)
