= Capitoline Venus =

Statue of Venus (modest Venus)

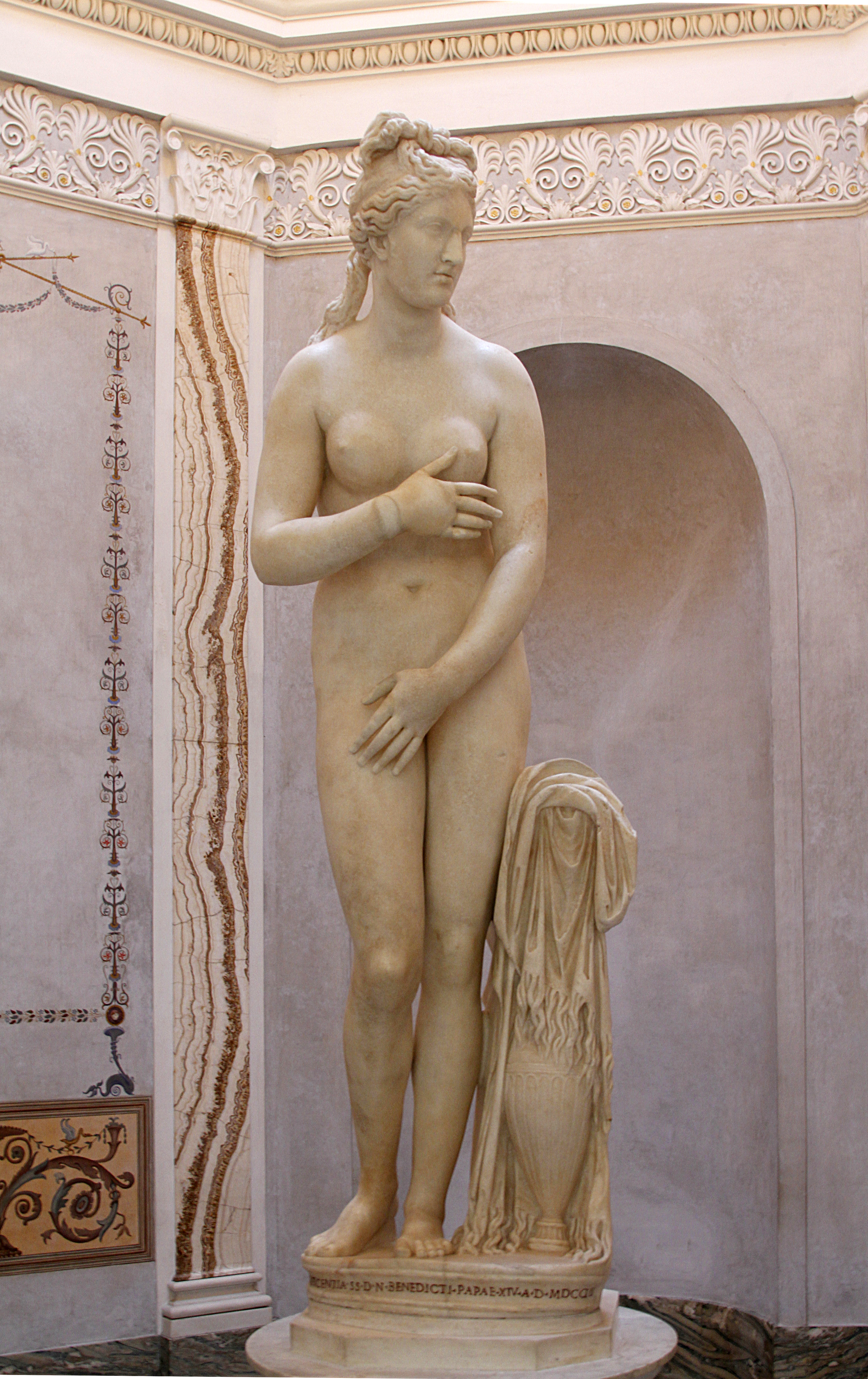
The Capitoline Venus (Capitoline Museums).

The Capitoline Venus is a type of statue of Venus, specifically one of several Venus Pudica (modest Venus) types (others include the Venus de' Medici type), of which several examples exist. The type ultimately derives from the Aphrodite of Cnidus. The Capitoline Venus and her variants are recognisable from the position of the arms—standing after a bath, Venus begins to cover her breasts with her right hand, and her groin with her left hand.

This original of this type (from which the following copies derive) is thought to be a lost 3rd- or 2nd-century BCE variation on Praxiteles' work from Asia Minor, which modifies the Praxitelean tradition by a carnal and voluptuous treatment of the subject and the goddess's modest gesture with both hands—rather than only one over the groin, in Praxiteles's original.

== Principal example ==
The Capitoline Venus is a slightly over lifesize marble statue of Venus. It is an Antonine copy of a late Hellenistic sculpture that ultimately derives from Praxiteles (Helbig 1972:128–30).

It was found on the Viminal Hill during the pontificate of Clement X (1670–76) in the gardens belonging to the Stazi near San Vitale. Pope Benedict XIV purchased it from the Stazi family in 1752 and gave it to the Capitoline Museums, where it is housed in a niche of its own—called "the cabinet of Venus"—on the first floor of the Palazzo Nuovo on the Campidoglio.

The statue was on loan to the United States and was shown in the rotunda of the West Building of the National Gallery of Art in Washington, D.C. from June 8 to September 18, 2011.

Its reputation vis-a-vis the Venus de' Medici in Florence grew only slowly, according to Haskell and Penny, fueled in part as a negative sensitivity to extensive restorations began to undermine the Florentine Venus. It was later seized, and relocated to Paris by Napoleon under the terms of the Treaty of Tolentino; the Emperor commissioned a marble replica from Joseph Chinard, now at the Château de Compiègne. When the original was returned to the Capitoline Museums in 1816, the plaster cast that had replaced it during the Napoleonic era was shipped to Britain, where John Flaxman praised it to his students (Haskell and Penny 1981:319).

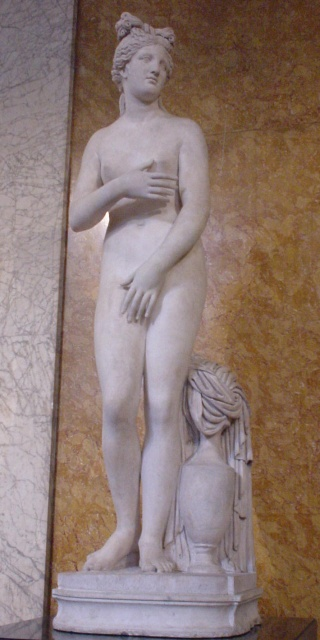
Campo Iemini Venus (British Museum)

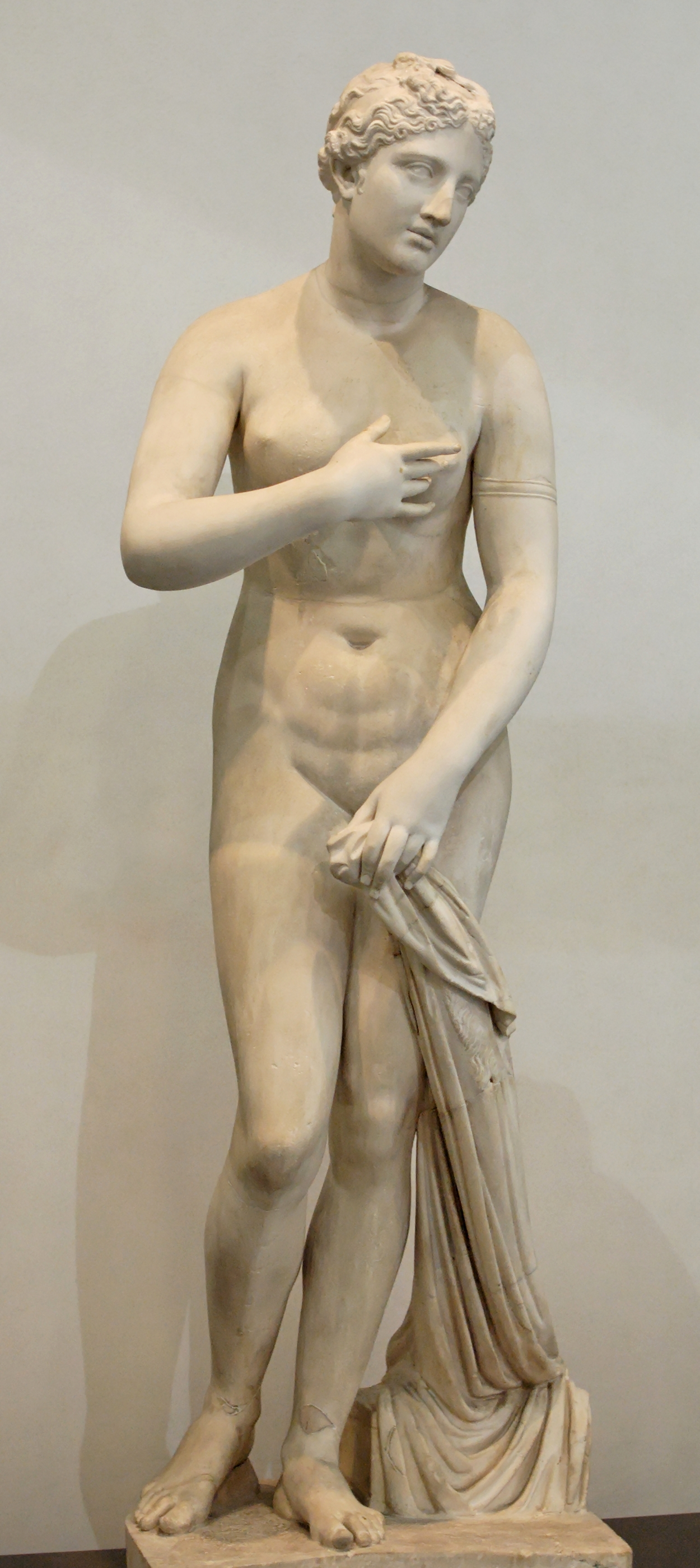
Aphrodite of Menophantos (Museo Nazionale Romano)

== Other copies ==
External videos
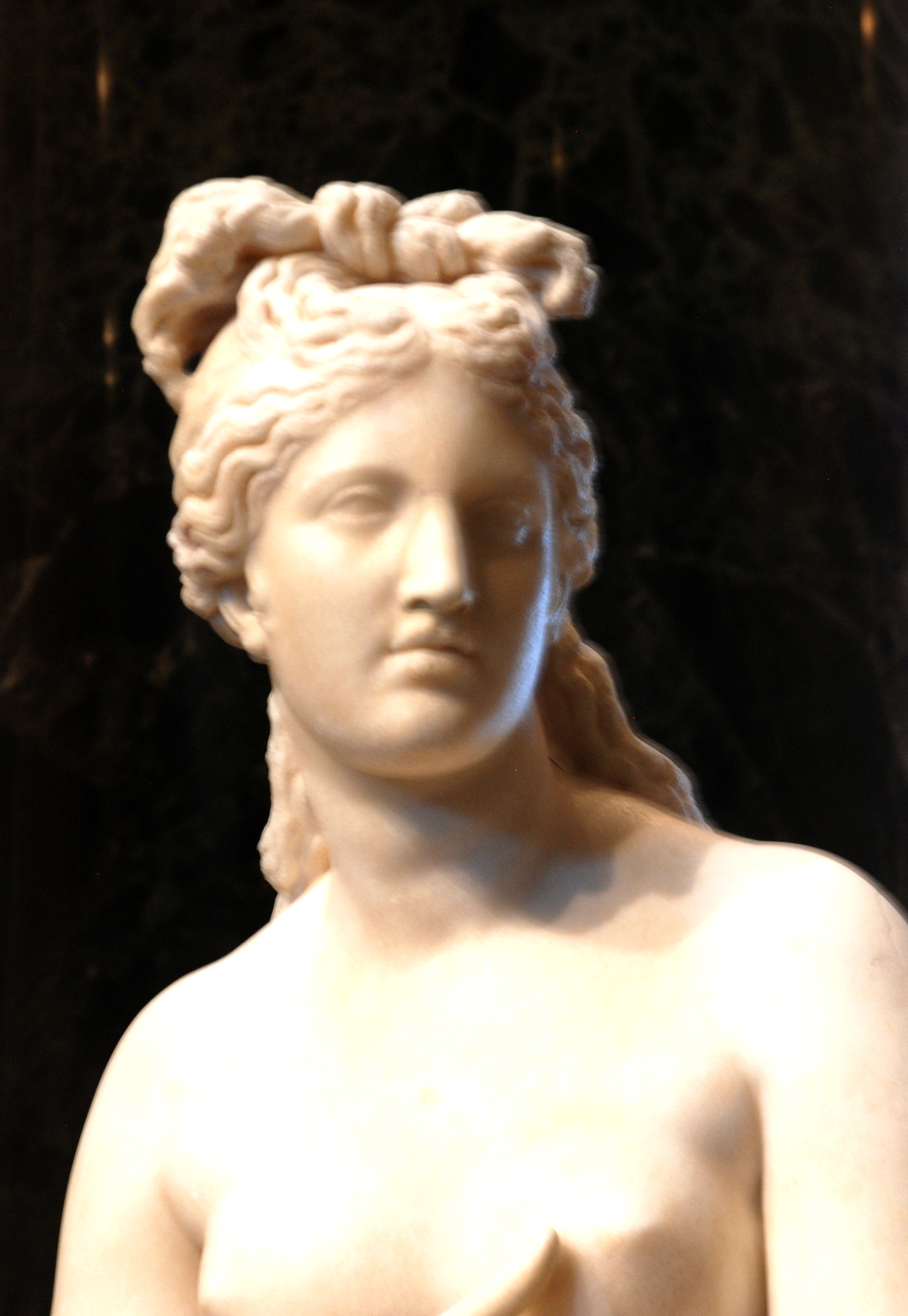
- Capitoline Venus, Smarthistory

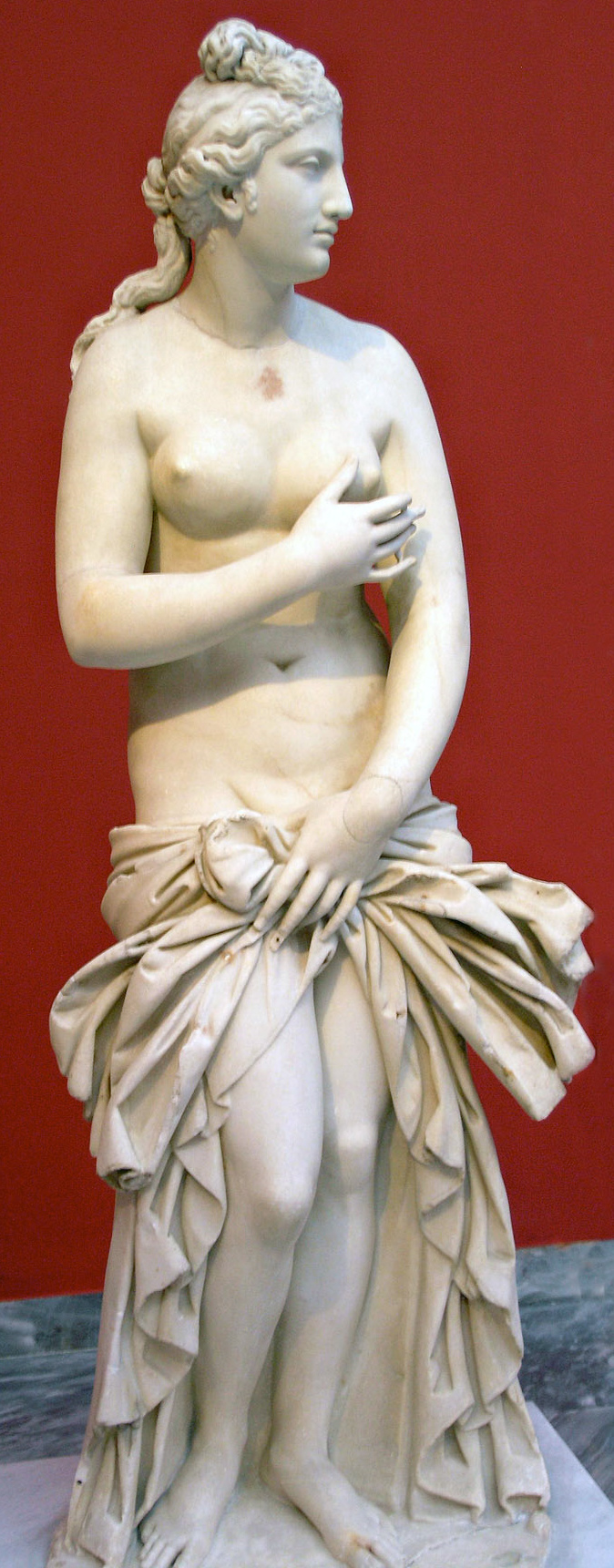
The Aphrodite of Syracuse, a 2nd-century copy of a 4th-century BCE original by Praxiteles, at the National Archaeological Museum, Athens.

About 50 copies of Venus Pudica are extant, with most of them displayed in Europe.

- The Aphrodite of Menophantos was found at the Camaldolese monastery of San Gregorio al Celio. It bears the signature of Menophantos, a Greek sculptor, apparently of the 1st century BCE, of whom nothing more is known. The Camaldolese coenobites occupy the ancient church and monastery of S. Gregorii in Clivo Scauri founded by Pope Gregory the Great on his own family property, on the slope (clivus) of the Caelian Hill about 580. His foundation was dedicated in honor of the apostle Andrew. By the 10th century Gregory's name was appended to that of the apostle, whom he eventually supplanted. The sculpture came into the possession of prince Chigi. Johann Joachim Winckelmann described this sculpture in his Geschichte der Kunst des Altertums (vol V, ch. II).
- The Campo Iemini Venus, another sculpture of the same model, was unearthed in the spring of 1792 among other sculptures in the excavation of a Roman villa at Campo Iemini, near Torvaianica, in Lazio. The dig was directed by the English dealer in Roman antiquities Robert Fagan (1761–1816) under the patronage of Prince Augustus, the Duke of Sussex in partnership with Sir Corbet Corbet of the British Museum. At the time of its discovery the English in particular found it superior to the Capitoline Venus. After restoration in Rome it was shipped to London, where Prince Augustus gave it to his brother the Prince Regent, who set it up at Carlton House. After his death, when Carlton House was replaced by a terrace of houses, William IV donated it to the British Museum.
- A 2nd-century Roman copy of Parian marble was found at Baiae.
- A version of Venus Pudica was also found in Hadrian Baths at Leptis Magna. The Hadrianic Baths were excavated in the 1920s, and the Lepcitanian copy of the Capitoline Venus was taken away to Europe by Benito Mussolini, who gave it to the Nazi-leader Hermann Göring. The statue graced the bedroom of his country estate near Berlin, Carinhall. It was returned to Libya in 1999. and today, it is in the National Archaeological Museum in Tripoli.
- Another armless copy of Capitoline Venus, kept at Jamahiriya Museum, Tripoli, Libya.
- One variant is kept at the Hermitage Museum, St. Petersburg, as well as the similar Venus Tauride.
- The Venus Landolina at the Syracuse Archeological Museum in Sicily. It is a headless Imperial Roman copy of a 2nd-century, similar to the Aphrodite of Syracuse kept in Athens.
- A 3rd century copy was found during archaeological excavations at Skupi, an ancient Roman town in North Macedonia.
- A 2nd to 3rd century Italian marble copy of Capitoline Venus is the result of connecting the lower part of an ancient body, a torso from the 16th century and an ancient face and the top of head. It was previously in the Borghese collection, and now kept at Louvre Museum, Paris. Inv No. MR. 279 (Usual No Ma 369).
- A copy of Capitoline Venus is held at Galleria degli Uffizi. It entered the Medici collections after a purchase from the Colonna family. The statue lacked arms, head and right leg. The Medici had it integrated by sculptor Silla in 1584 and the statue thus acquired its present aspect as a faithful reproduction of the Capitoline Venus.
- A 2nd century copy of Capitoline Venus is held by the National Museum in Warsaw.
- A headless statue of Capitoline Venus made in the 2nd-3rd century is held at the Naples Archaeological Museum.
- A headless painted Roman period marble copy of Capitoline Venus of the 2nd century from Aphrodias, Asia Minor, was excavated by the Hebrew University of Jerusalem (H: 159 cm; W: 60 cm).
- A damaged ancient copy of Capitoline Venus is kept at Antalya Archaeological Museum.
- A torso from white marble, 2nd century, unknown provenance at Museo Nazionale Romano: Terme di Diocleziano, inv. 2000656, Rome, Italy.
- TA head from white marble, dated to the last quarter of the 1st century BCE — beginning of the 1st century CE, at Cremona, San Lorenzo Archaeological Museum. Origin: Cremona, p-zza Marconi.
- A Roman period marble torso, similar to the Aphrodite Syracuse, held at the Cyprus Museum.
