= Venus Felix (sculpture) =

Sculpture of Venus and her son Cupid

Coordinates: 41°54′24.50″N 12°27′09.19″E

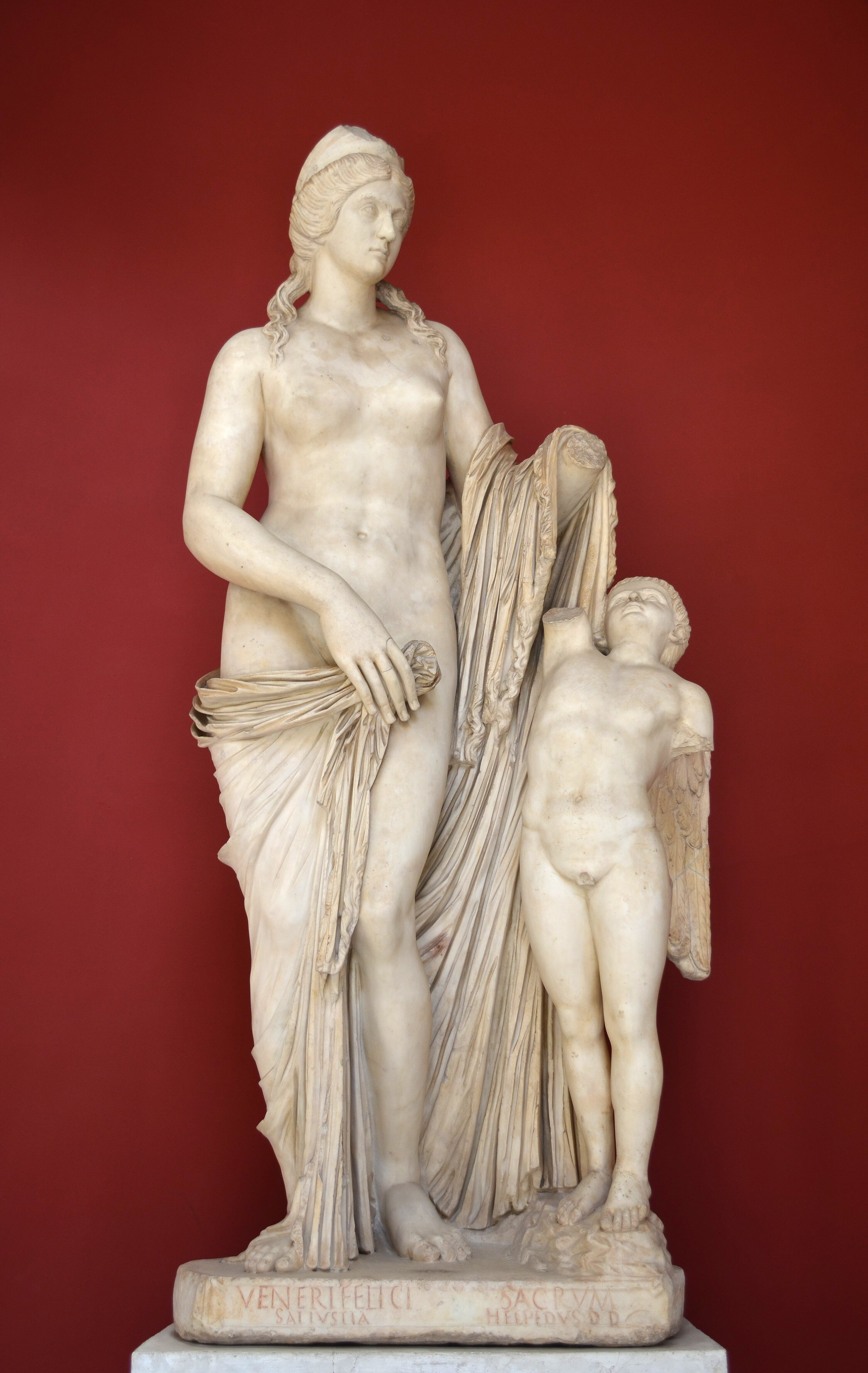
- Year: 2nd century AD
- Medium: Sculpture

The Venus Felix is a sculpture of Venus and her son Cupid which dates back to the 2nd-century AD. It was dedicated by Sallustia and Helpidus to Venus Felix. Its head resembles Faustina the Younger. It is now held at the Pius-Clementine museum of the Vatican Museums, Rome, and is displayed in the Octagon of the Hermes Hall.

== Description ==
The Venus Felix is a 2.14 meter high marble carving of Venus and Cupid. One of the arms of the Venus, and both of the Cupid's arms, are broken. It is not known when or where the statue was discovered; it is recorded in the papal collections in 1509. In the eighteenth century, the antiquarian Francesco Ficoroni claimed that the Venus had been found near Santa Croce in Gerusalemme, though there is no evidence to support this. The sculpture is sometimes identified as a portrait of Faustina the Younger. On the basis of the inscription, the sculpture was previously identified as depicting Sallustia Orbiana, the wife of the emperor Severus Alexander, though it does not resemble the portraits of her known from coins.
