= Robert Fagan =

British painter

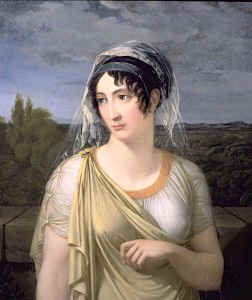
Portrait of Miss Emily Manley, Robert Fagan, Oil on canvas in a fine carved neo-classical frame, 27½ x 23½ in, 70 x 59 cm

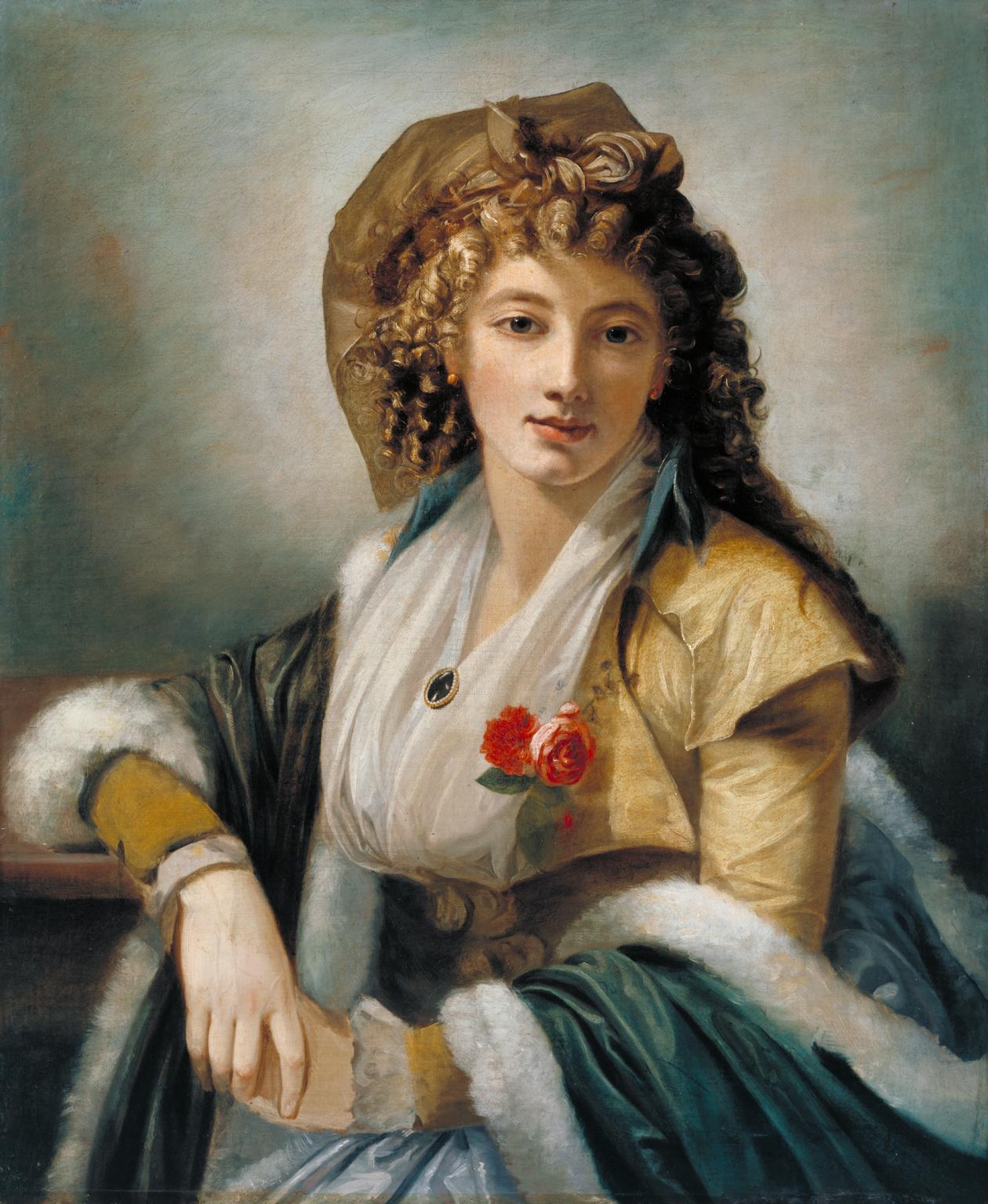
Anna Maria Ferri, the Artist's First Wife, by Robert Fagan, circa 1790–92 (Tate)

Robert Fagan (c. 1761 – 26 August 1816) was a painter, diplomat and archaeologist. Born in London, he spent most of his career in Rome and Sicily.

== Career ==
The son of Cork immigrants, Fagan was born ca. 1761 in London.

He arrived in Rome in 1781. Like other artists in Rome he became involved in dealing in antiquities, and, with the financial backing of some British patrons, carried out several archeological digs. In 1792 he excavated at Vigna San Sebastiano on Via Appia, financed by Corbet Corbet (whose portrait he painted that year). In 1793 the visiting British Prince Augustus Frederick secured permission from the Pope for Fagan to export antiquities. As an archaeologist he was involved in the excavations near Laurentum, which resulted in the discovery of the Venus, now at the Capitoline. As an artist, he made a career out of painting portraits, often for traveling British families. He was married twice, first to Anna Marie Ferri and then to Maria Ludovica Flajani a young Italian girl whom he married in 1801, just six months after his first wife's death.

Following the Napoleonic occupation of Rome Fagan fled to Naples in 1797, but after a brief stay in Florence he returned to Rome and managed to despatch to Britain paintings by Claude and Moroni and other possessions to Naples. In 1807 he moved to Sicily. In 1809, following his daughter's marriage to William Baker, Fagan was made British Consul general in Sicily. That year he began digging at Selinunte, and in 1812 at Tyndaris.

Fagan fell into debt, and committed suicide in Rome by jumping from a window. After his death his young widow sold to the Vatican museums the antiquities which he had excavated.

His grandson Louis Alexander Fagan was a noted engraver and writer.

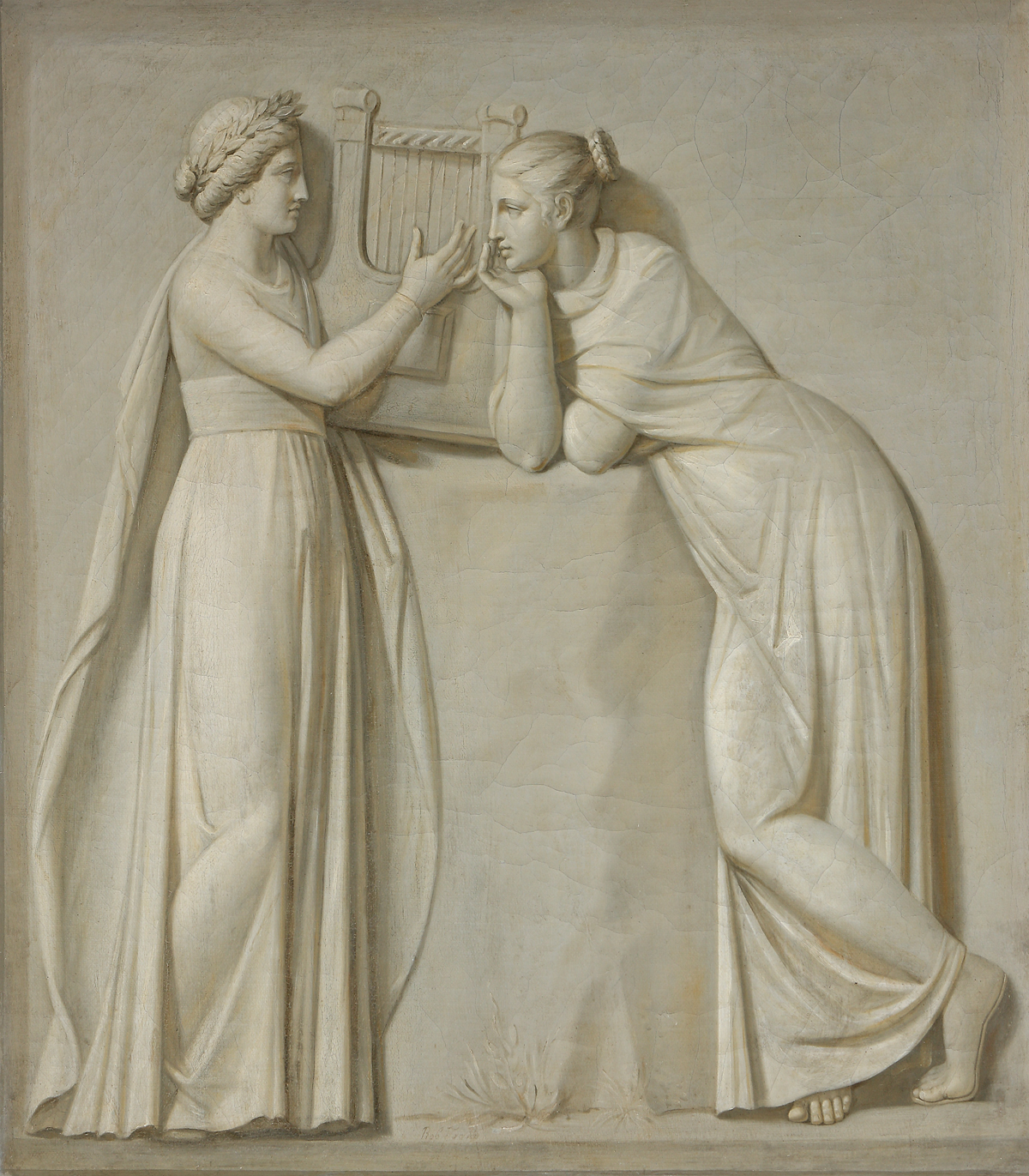
The Muses, Terpsichore and Polyhymnia (between 1793 and 1795)

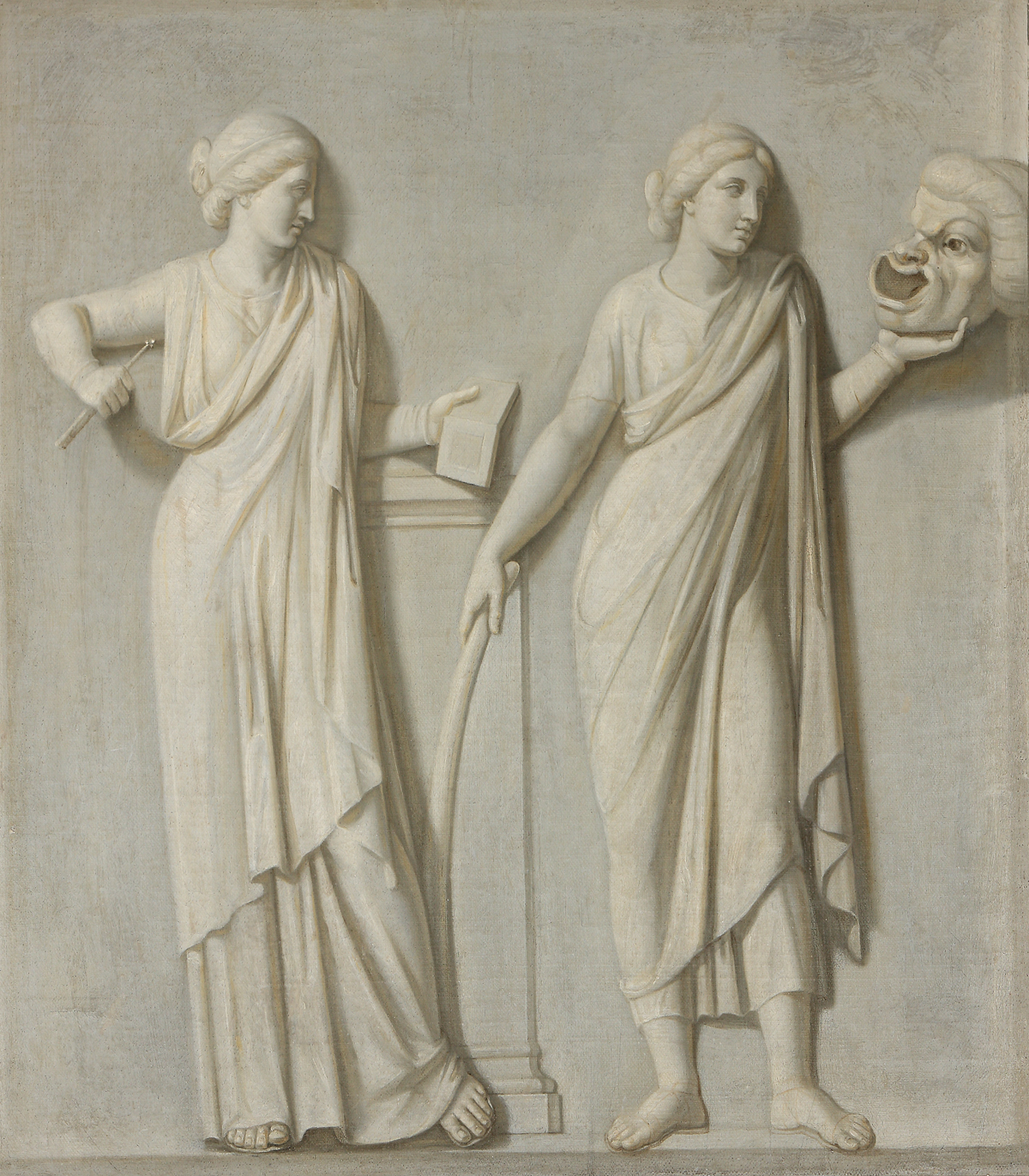
The Muses, Clio and Thalia (between 1793 and 1795)

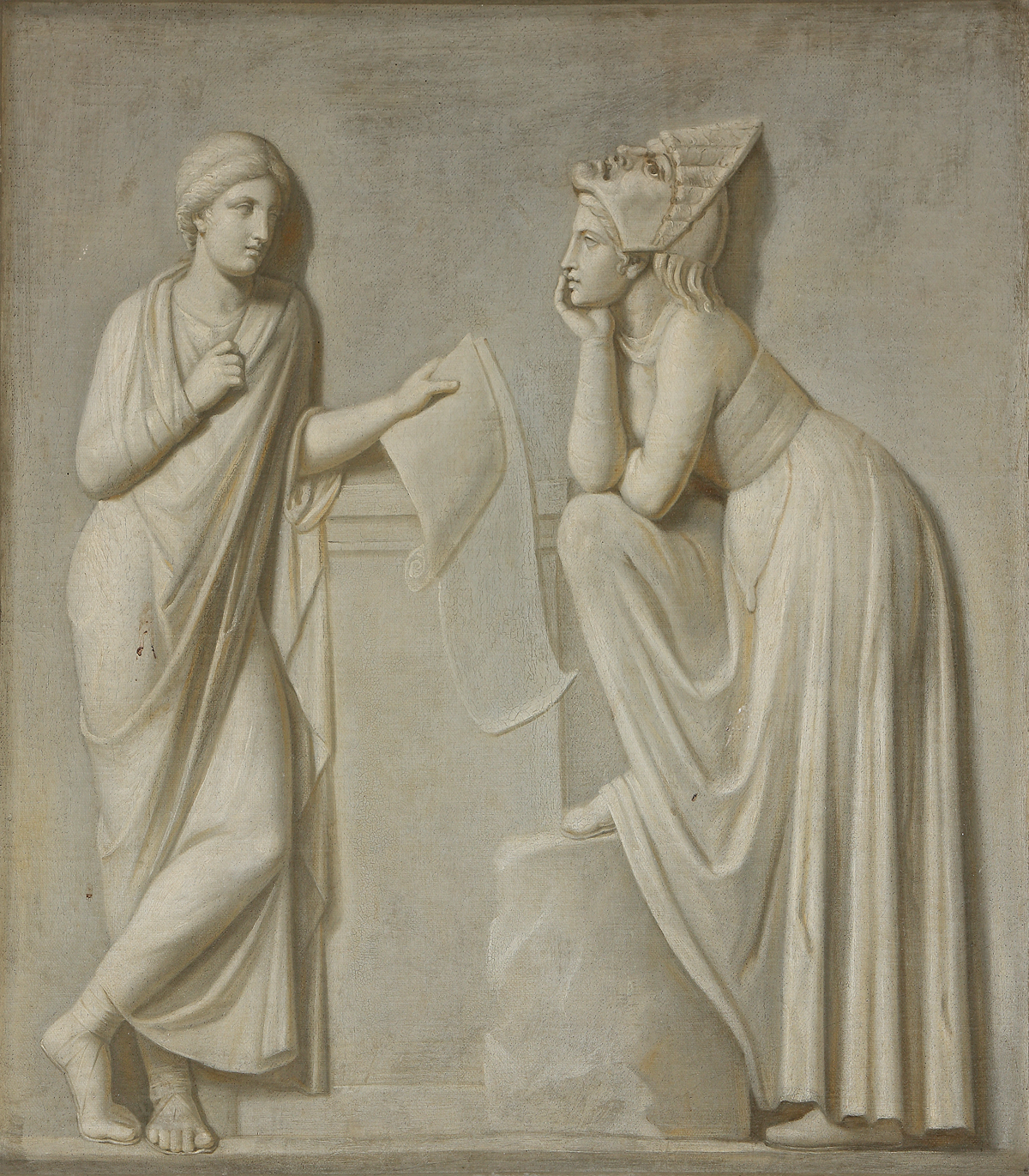
The Muses, Clio and Thalia (between 1793 and 1795)

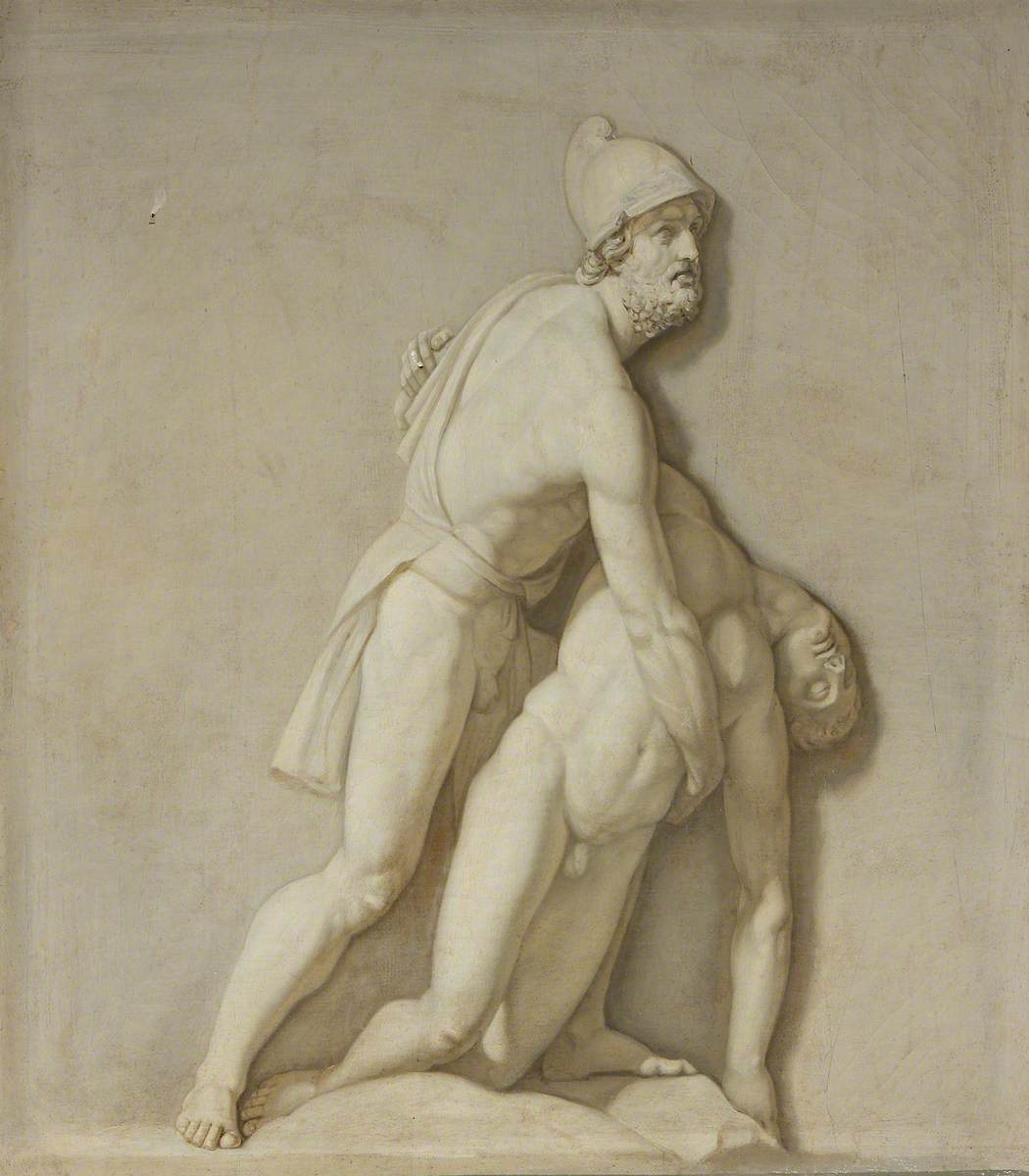
Pasquino (Menelaus supporting the Body of Patroclus) (between 1793 and 1795)
