= Dalyan =

Resort town in Muğla Province, Turkey

- Neighbourhood
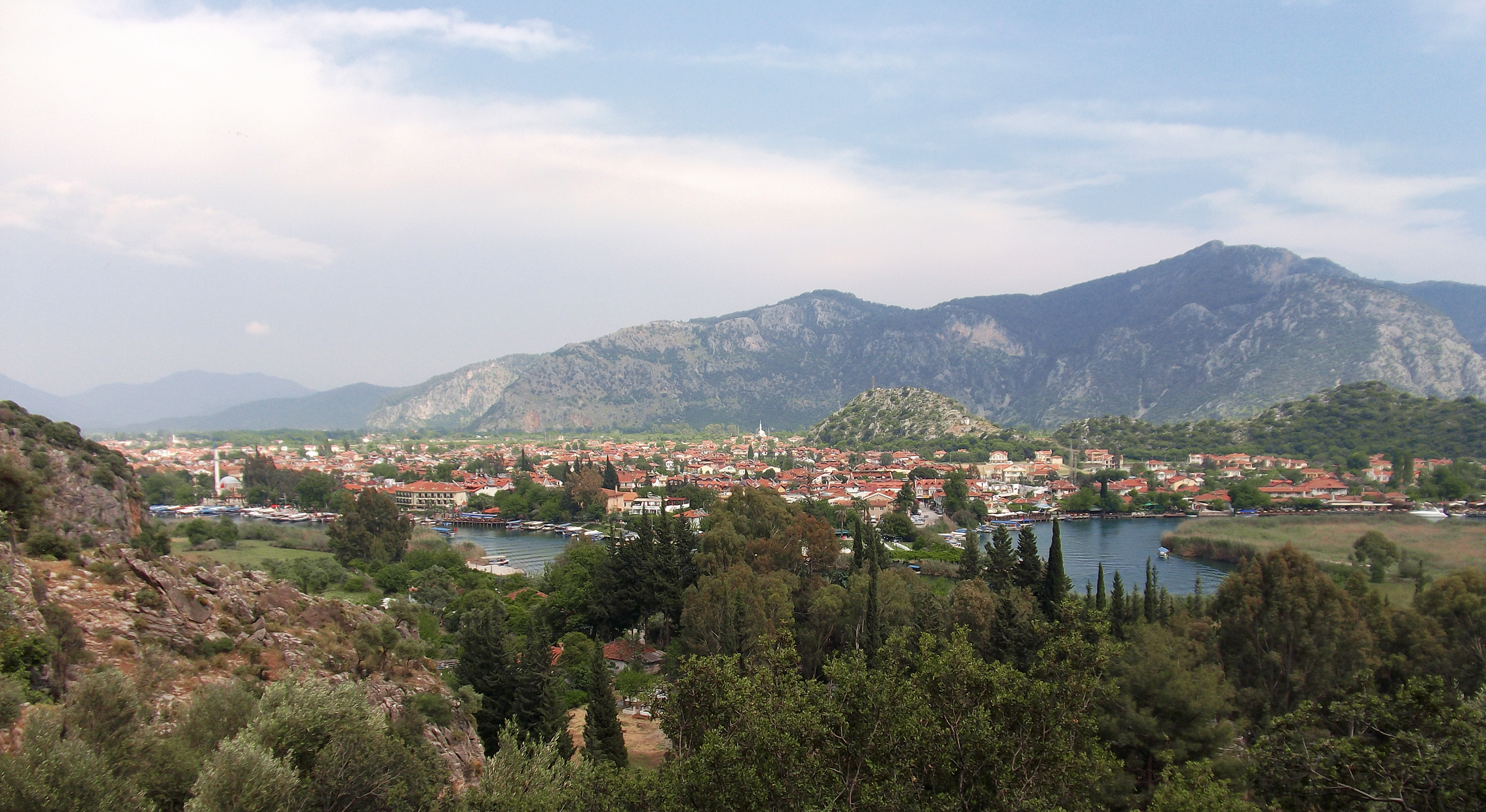
- Dalyan view seen from Lycian tombs

- Location within Turkey Location within Turkey Aegean
- Coordinates: 36°50′03″N 28°38′33″E
- Country: Turkey
- Province: Muğla
- District: Ortaca
- Population (2022): 5,829
- Time zone: UTC+3 (TRT)
- Postal code: 48600
- Area code: 0252

Dalyan is a neighbourhood of the municipality and district of Ortaca, Muğla Province, Turkey. Its population is 5,829 (2022). Before the 2013 reorganisation, it was a town (belde). It is located between Marmaris and Fethiye on the south-west coast of Turkey.

Dalyan achieved international fame in 1987 when developers wanted to build a luxury hotel on the nearby İztuzu Beach, a breeding ground for the endangered loggerhead sea turtle species. The incident created major international storm when David Bellamy championed the cause of conservationists such as June Haimoff, Peter Günther, Nergis Yazgan, Lily Venizelos and Keith Corbett. The development project was temporarily stopped after Prince Philip called for a moratorium and in 1988 the beach and its hinterland were declared a protected area, viz. Köyceğiz-Dalyan Special Environmental Protection Area.

Life in Dalyan revolves around the Dalyan Çayı River which flows past the town. The boats that ply up and down the river, navigating the maze of reeds, are the preferred means of transport to local sites.

== Etymology ==
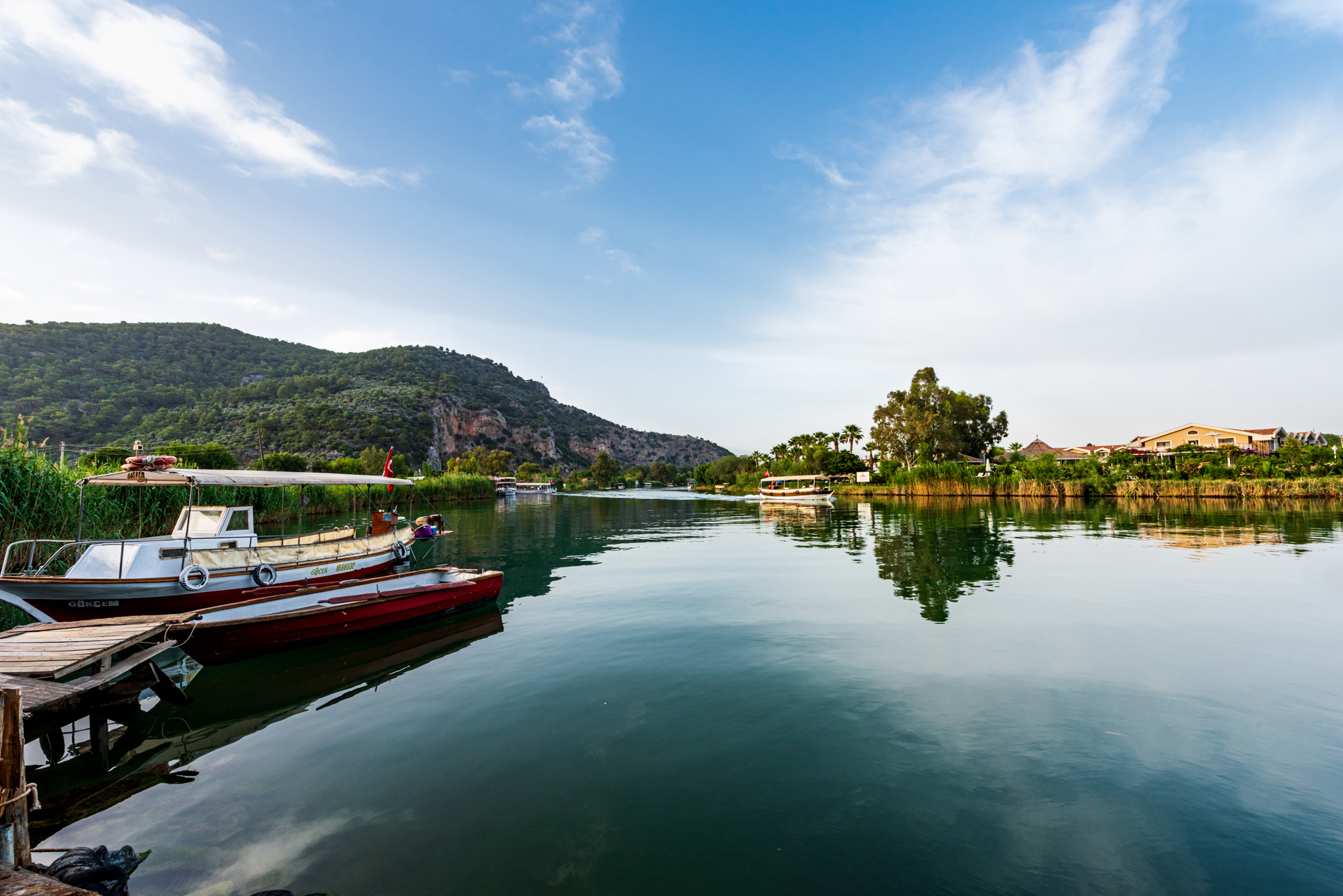
Dalyan River

Dalyan means "fishing weir" in Turkish. Bass, Mullet and Sea Bream swim upstream from the sea to Köyceğiz Lake where another large town of the region, Köyceğiz, is located. The fish spawn there, and when returning to the sea they are caught in the "dalyans". According to the Turkish etymological dictionary Nişanyan Sözlük, Dalyan (ta aliana) derives from the Greek word aliia (αλιεία), which means fishing or fishery.

== Economy ==
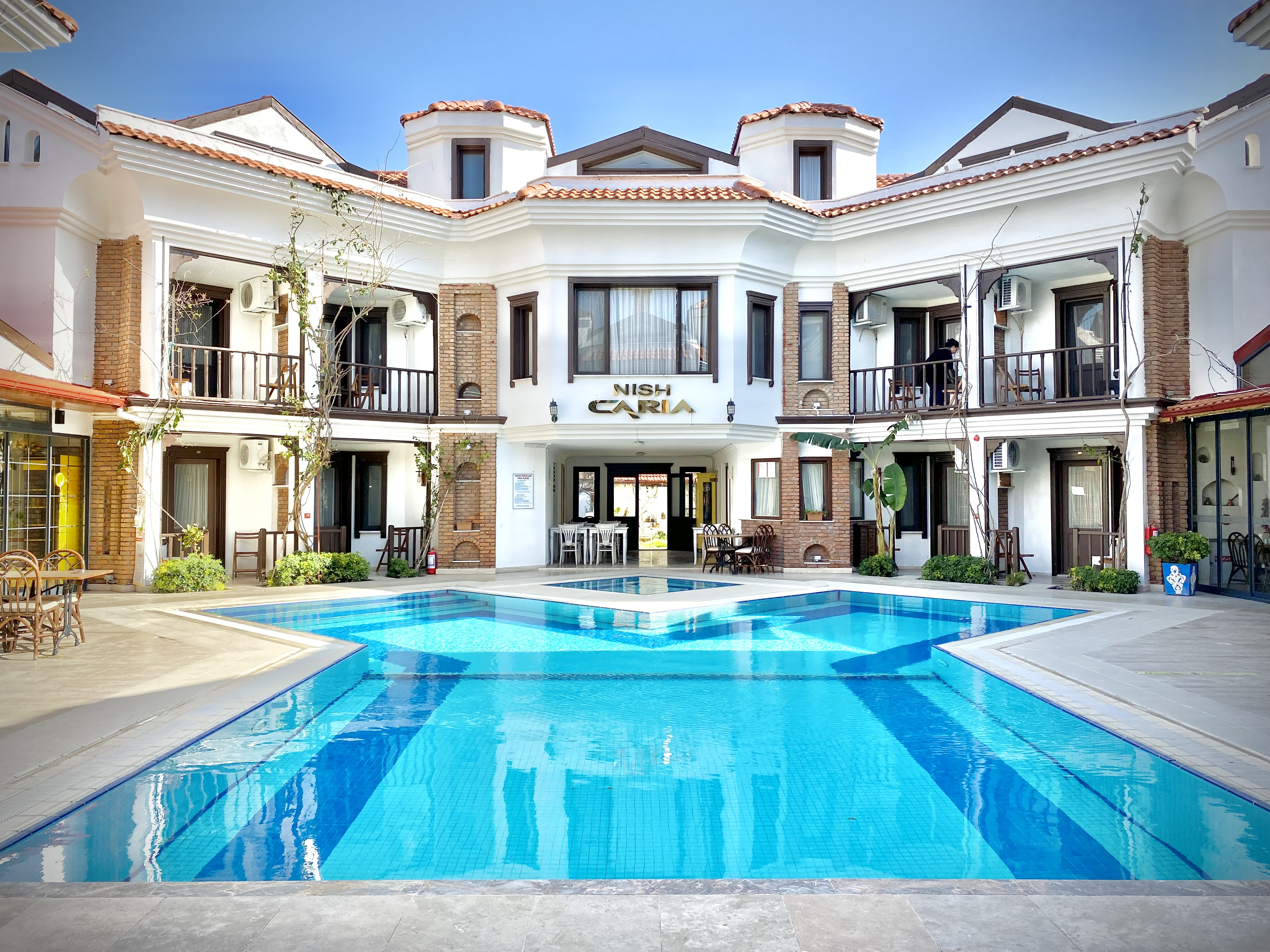
A hotel in Dalyan

In addition to its attraction as a tourist destination, the region around Dalyan is a highly fertile and productive agricultural zone. Cotton used to be grown intensively, but has now largely been replaced by pomegranate. In the area around Köyceğiz many other fruits (citrus fruits) and vegetables are grown, which are all on display in the market on Saturdays, the day when villagers come from miles around to sell their products.

== Tourism ==
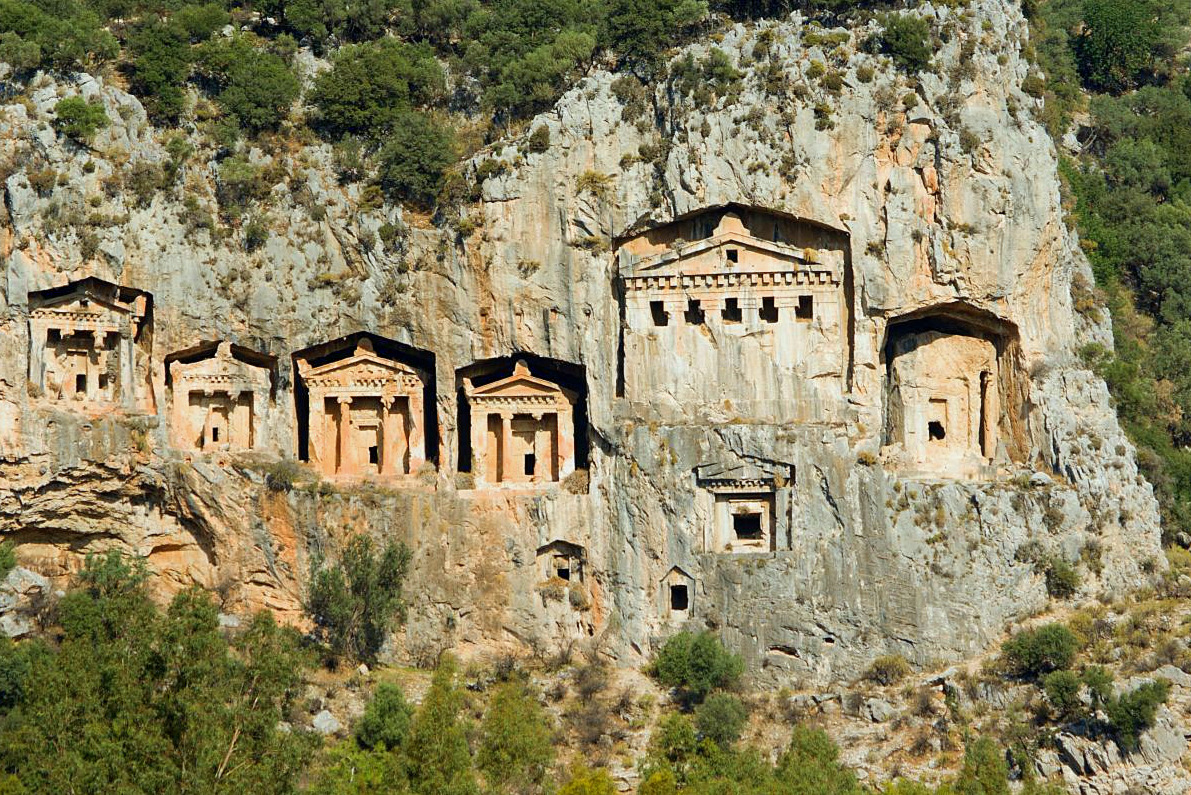
Lycian tombs near Dalyan across the Dalyan river

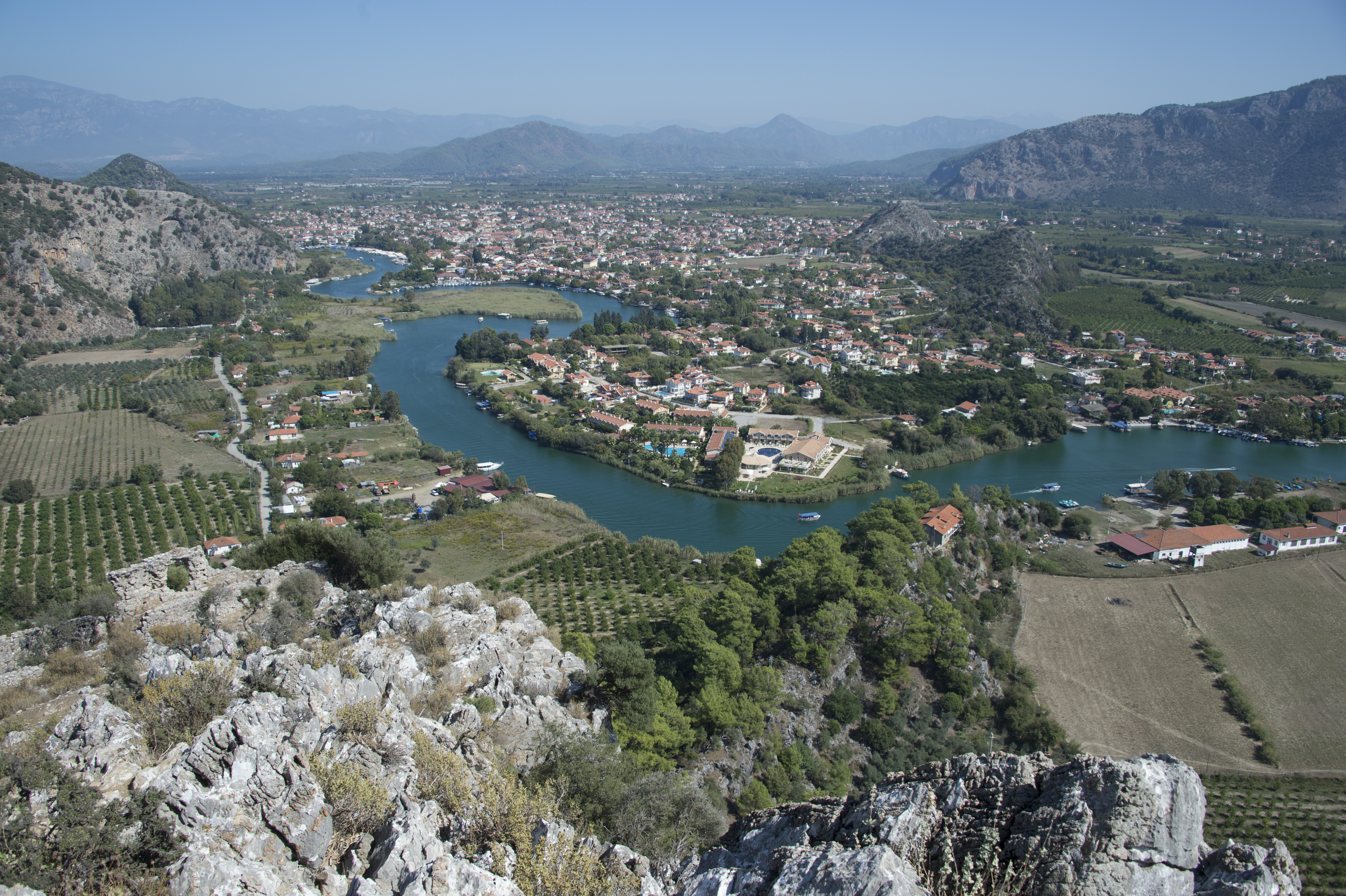
Views from Kaunos acropolis

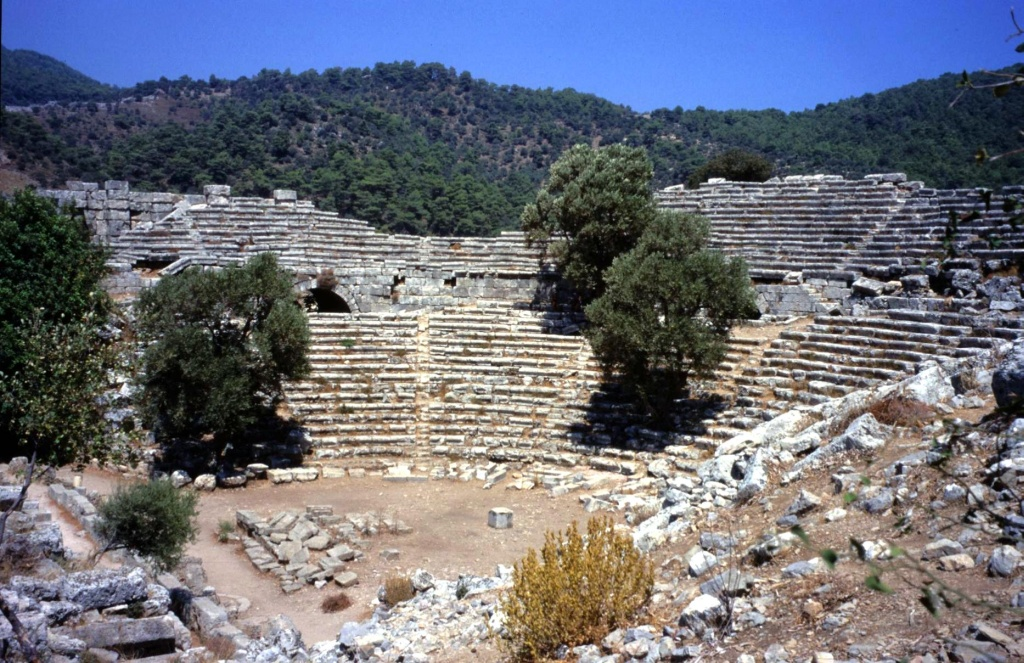
Ancient Kaunos theater near Dalyan

Above the river's sheer cliffs are the weathered façades of Lycian tombs cut from rock, circa 400 BC (36°50′1.09″N 28°38′3.16″E). The ruins of the ancient trading city of Kaunos are a short boat trip across the river.

The south of Dalyan on the Mediterranean coast, lies İztuzu Beach, near the village of the same name is a popular area for sunbathing and swimming. There are regular boat and minibus (dolmuş) services to the beach. Visitors should be aware of the wooden stakes in the beach to mark nesting sites. The road route is particularly scenic, offering views of Sülüngür Lake. In 2008 İztuzu Beach was proclaimed winner in the category Best Open Space (Europe) by The Times because of the eco-friendly exploitation of the beach. In 2011 Dalyan and İztuzu Beach were proclaimed Best Beach Destination of Europe by Dutch holiday assessment website Zoover.

== Conservation ==
The beach is well known for the Caretta caretta (Loggerhead sea turtle), an endangered species that has existed for about 45 million years. International animal protection organizations monitor and protect the turtles' nesting grounds in Turkey. The beach is closed overnight between the hours 20:00 and 08:00 during the period that the turtles lay their eggs and hatchlings go out to sea (May to October).
