= Kaunos =

Ancient Carian-Greek city

- Καῦνος (Greek)
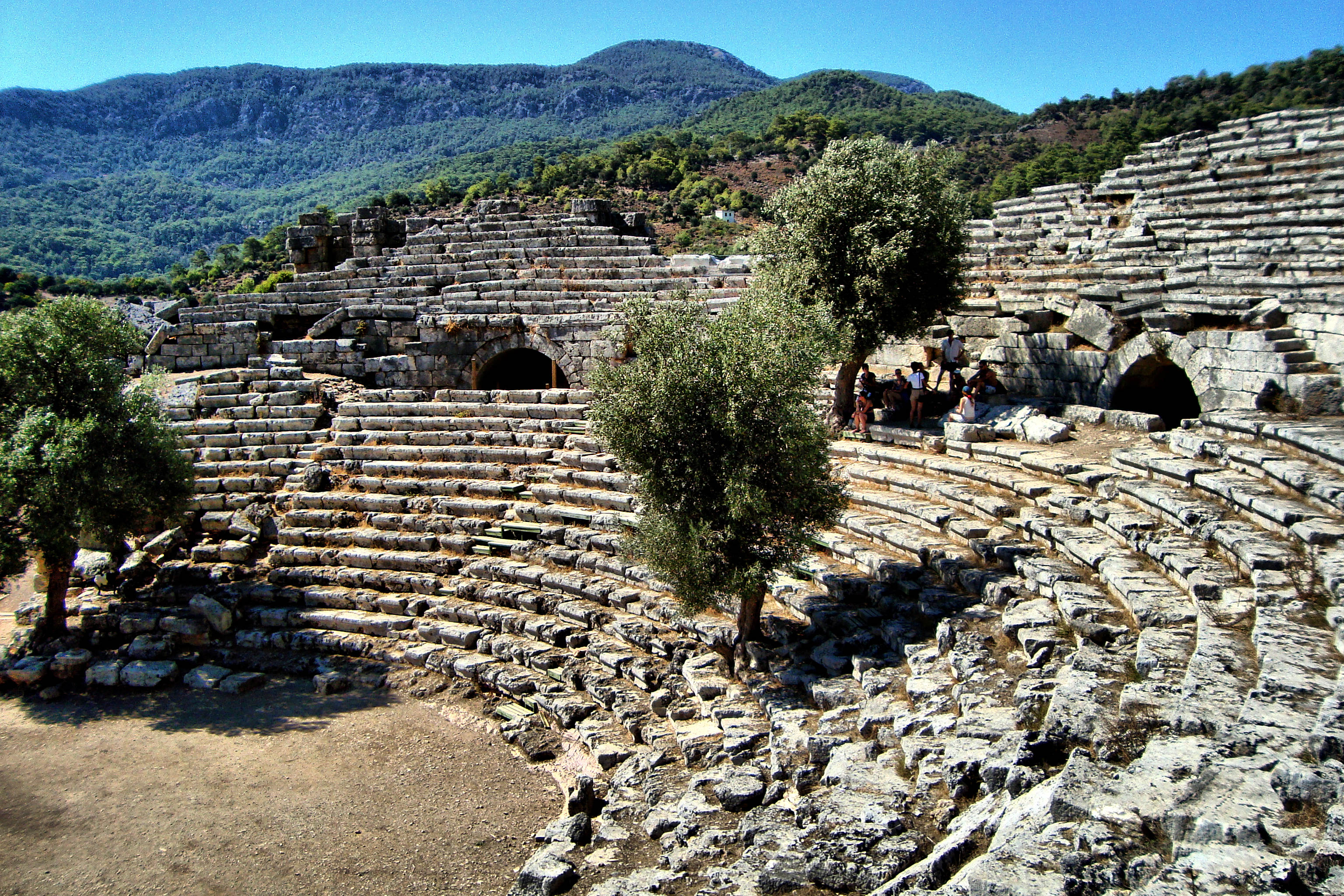
- Kaunos Theater

- Location within Turkey
- 36°49′35″N 28°37′17″E
- Type: Settlement
- Associated with: Protogenes, Zeno
- Location: Dalyan, Muğla Province, Turkey
- Region: Caria

History
- Built: 10th century BC
- Abandoned: 15th century AD

Site notes
- Condition: Ruined
- Owner: Public
- Public access: Yes
- Website: Kaunos Archaeological Site

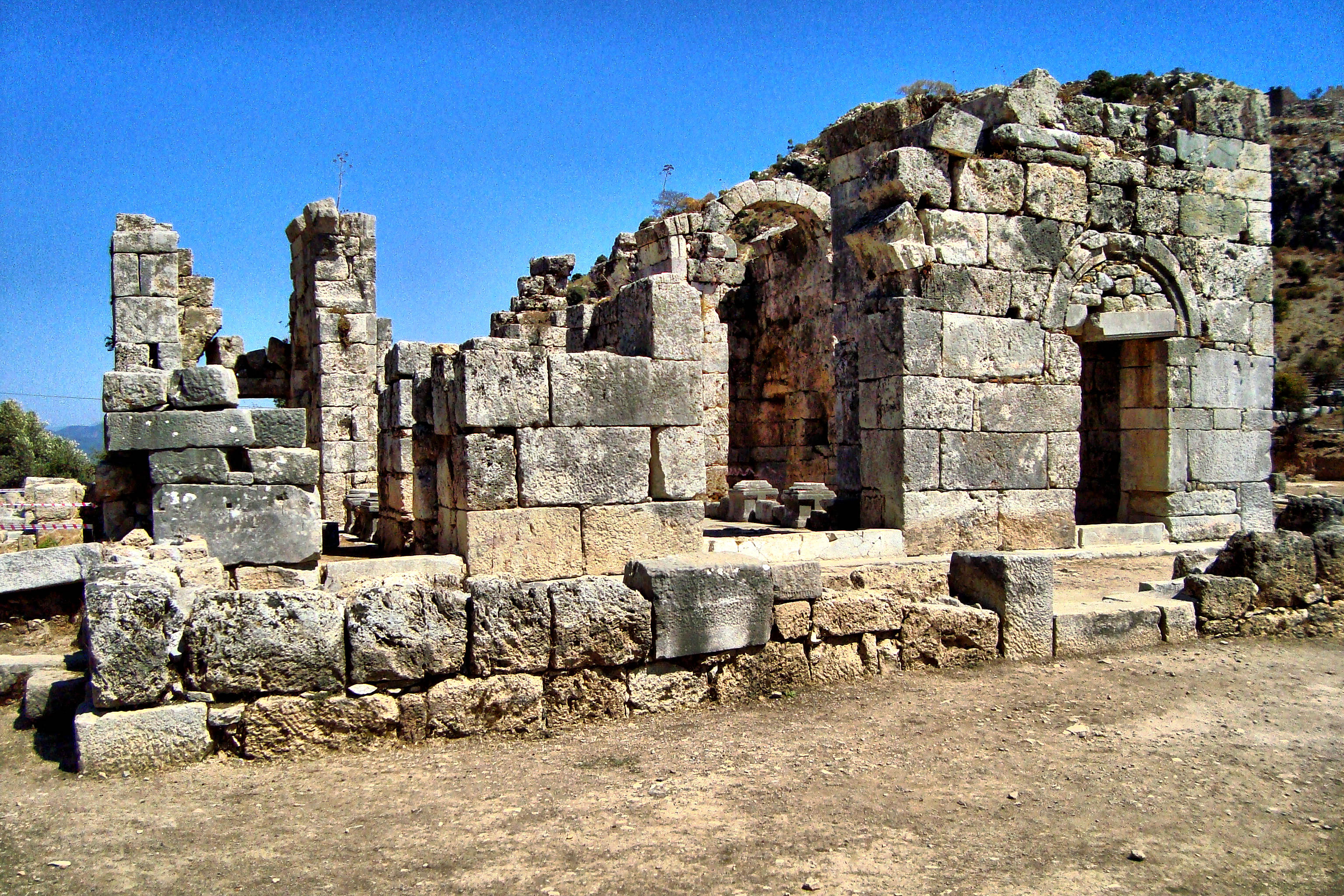
Kaunos Ruins.

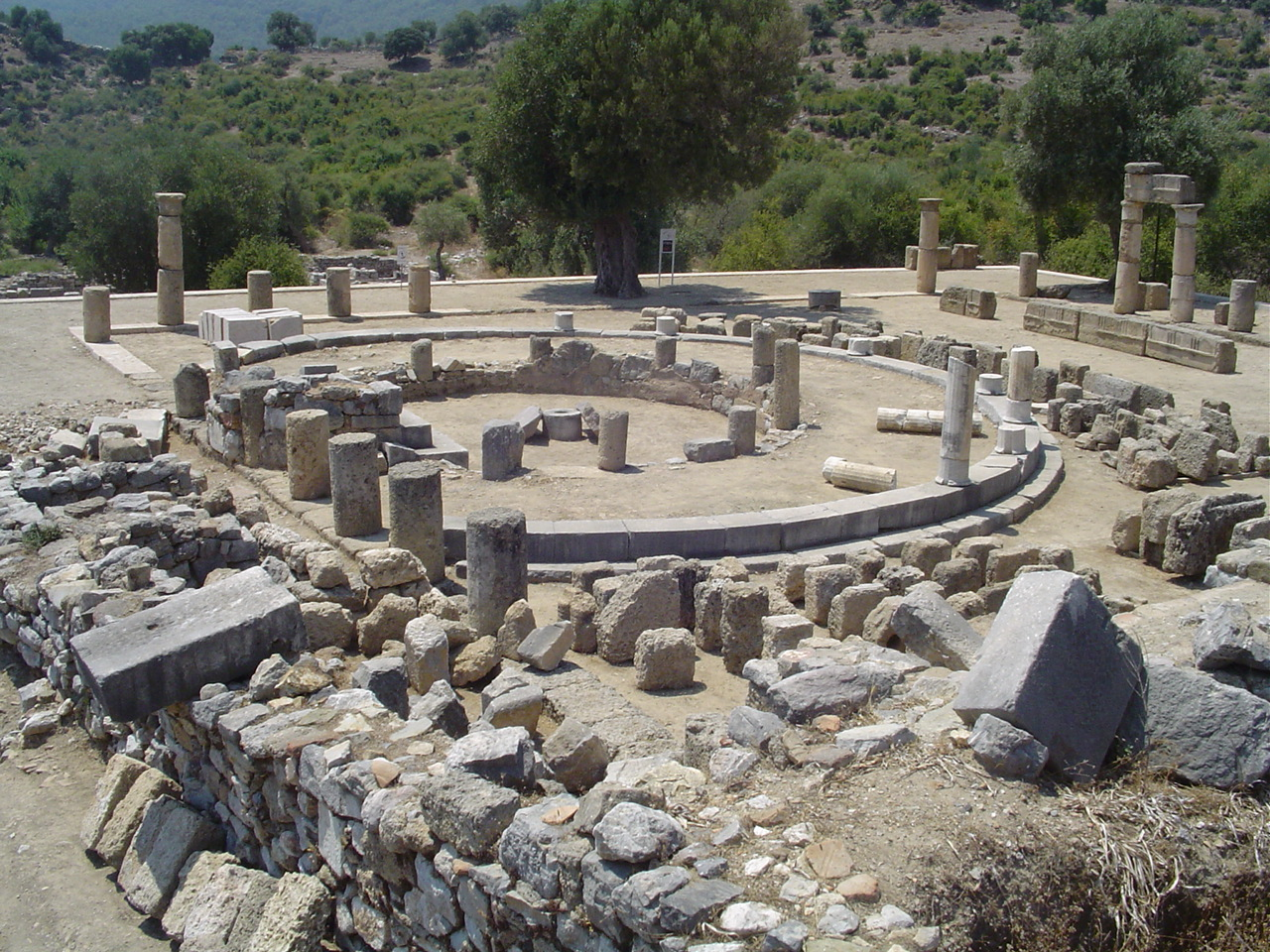
Columns from the site

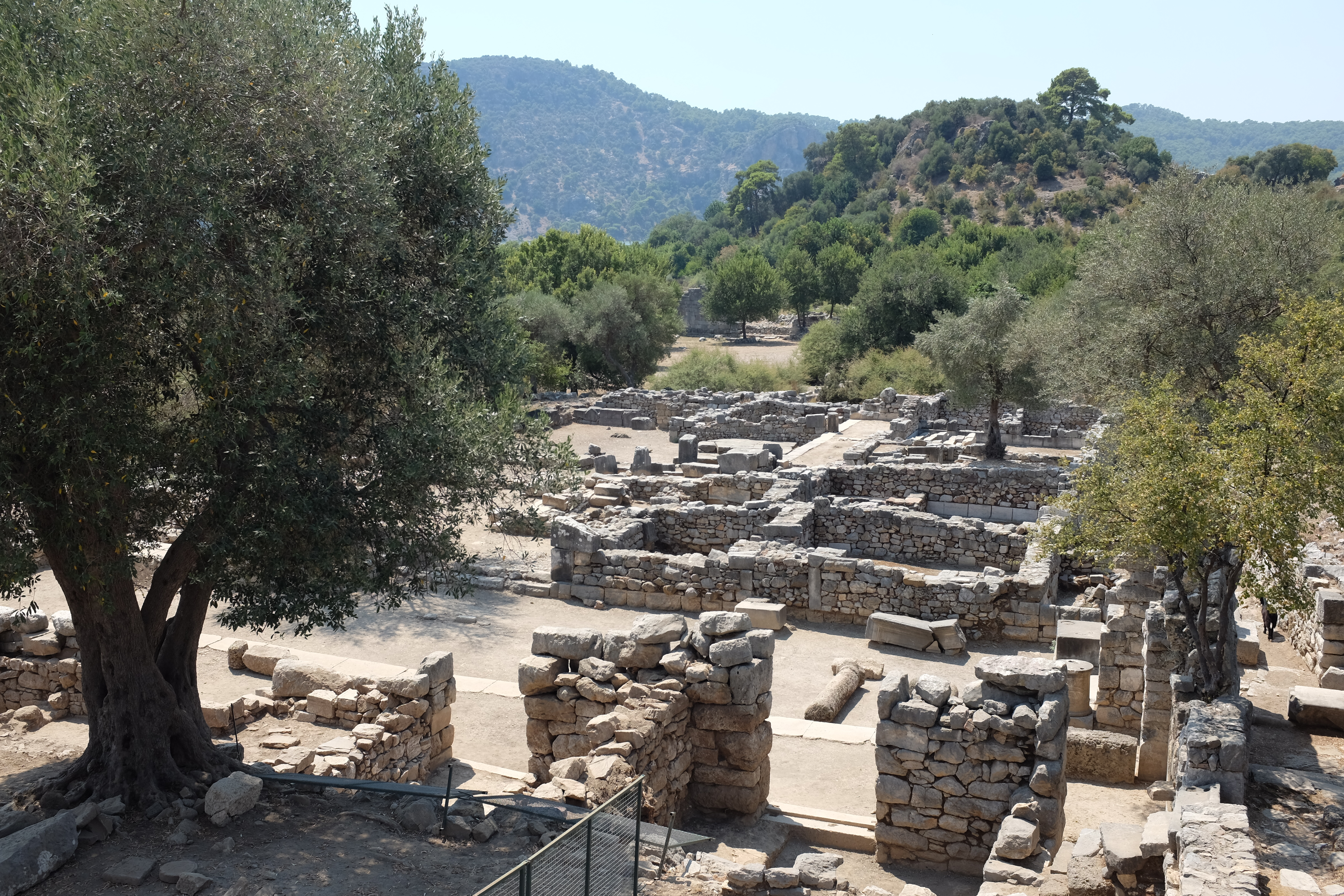
Residential Quarter

Kaunos (Carian: Kbid; Lycian: Xbide; Ancient Greek: Καῦνος; Latin: Caunus) was a city of ancient Caria in Anatolia, a few kilometres west of the modern town of Dalyan, Muğla Province, Turkey.

The Calbys river (now known as the Dalyan river) was the border between Caria and Lycia. Initially Kaunos was a separate state; then it became a part of Caria and later still of Lycia.

Kaunos was an important sea port, the history of which is supposed to date back to the 10th century BC. Because of the formation of İztuzu Beach and the silting of the former Bay of Dalyan (from approx. 200 BC onwards), Kaunos is now located about 8 km from the coast. The city had two ports, the southern port at the southeast of Küçük Kale and the inner port at its northwest (the present Sülüklü Göl, Lake of the Leeches). The southern port was used from the foundation of the city till roughly the end of the Hellenistic era, after which it became inaccessible due to its drying out. The inner or trade port could be closed by chains. The latter was used till the late days of Kaunos, but due to the silting of the delta and the ports, Kaunos had by then long lost its important function as a trade port. After the capture of Caria by Turkish tribes, and the serious malaria epidemic of the 15th century AD, Kaunos was completely abandoned.

In 1966, Prof. Baki Öğün started the excavations of ancient Kaunos. These have been continued up to the present day, and are now supervised by Prof. Cengiz Işık.

The archeological research is not limited to Kaunos itself, but is also carried out in locations nearby e.g. near the Sultaniye Spa where there used to be a sanctuary devoted to the goddess Leto.

== Name ==
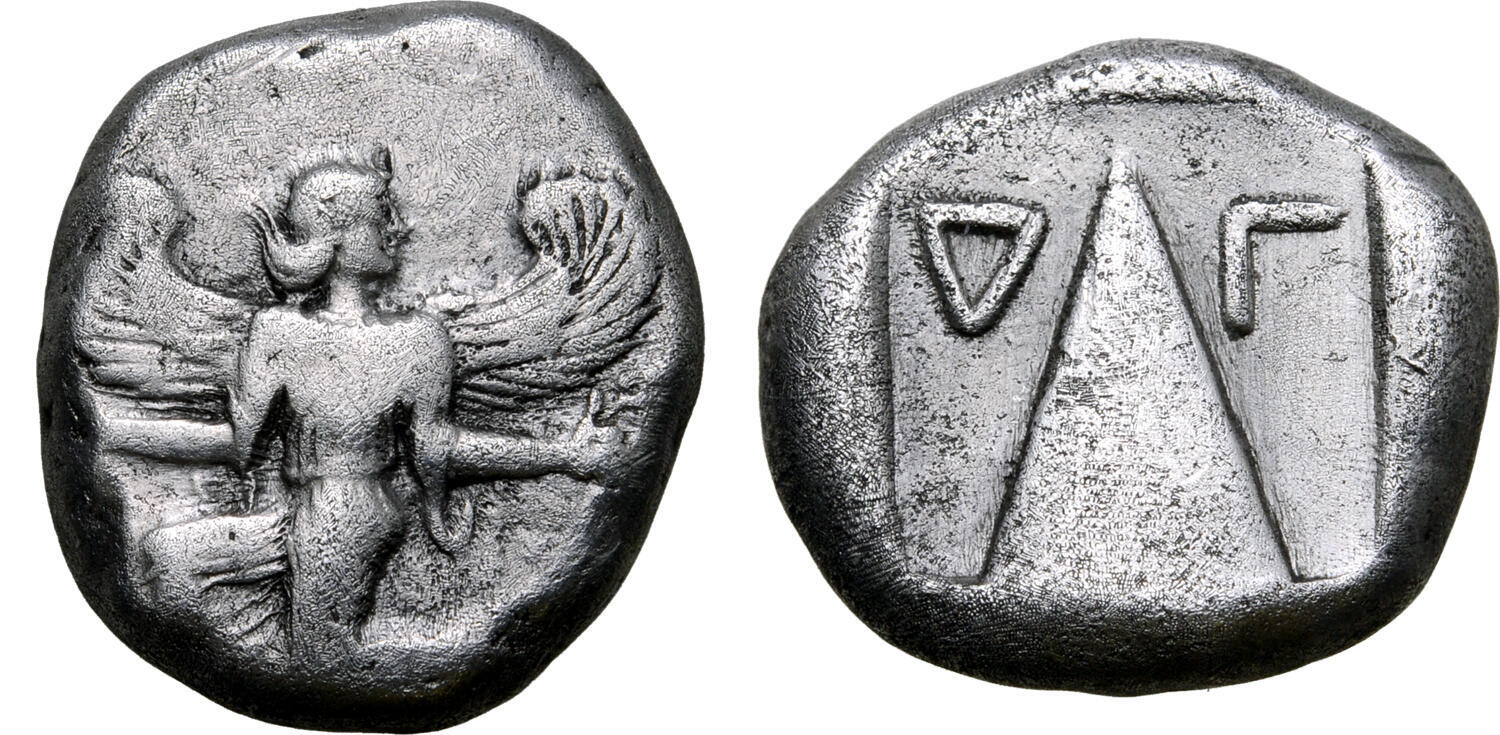
Silver stater, ca.410-390 BCE. With Carian caption Kb[id], 'Kaunos'.

The city was commonly known by its Greek name, Kaunos (Καῦνος). The Romans called Kaunos by its name in Latin, Caunus.

Kaunos' Carian name was Kbid (𐊼𐊬𐊹𐊢 in the Carian alphabet). A citizen of Kaunos, a 'Kaunian', was called Kbdyn (plural Kbdynš, 𐊼𐊬𐊢Ε𐊵𐊯). These terms were used on silver coinage and in stone inscriptions. This term fell out of use in the Hellenistic Period.

In Lycian texts such as the Letoon trilingual, the city was called Xbide (𐊜𐊂𐊆𐊅𐊁 in the Lycian alphabet), and Kaunians were called Xbidẽñni (𐊜𐊂𐊆𐊅𐊚𐊑𐊏𐊆).

== Mythology ==
According to mythology Kaunos was founded by King Kaunos, son of the Carian King Miletus and Kyane, and grandson of Apollo. Kaunos had a twin sister by the name of Byblis who developed a deep, unsisterly love for him. When she wrote her brother a love letter, telling him about her feelings, he decided to flee with some of his followers to settle elsewhere. His twin sister became mad with sorrow, started looking for him and tried to commit suicide. Mythology says that the Calbys river emerged from her tears.

== Origins ==
Herodotus differentiates the Kaunians from both the Carians and the Lycians, considering them indigenous people, although the Kaunians themselves claimed to have originated from Crete. He notes that their language was similar to Carian but not the same, as evidenced by an inscription discovered at Kaunos that contains characters absent from inscriptions in other areas of Caria. The earliest Greek inscriptions at Kaunos are found on the bases of statues of Hecatomnus and Mausolus. The later inscriptions show that Kaunos had become a Greek city, with none of its citizens bearing Carian names.

== History ==
The oldest find at the Kaunos archeological site is the neck of a Protogeometric amphora dating back to the 9th century BC, or even earlier. A statue found at the western gate of the city walls, pieces of imported Attic ceramics and the S-SE oriented city walls show habitation in the 6th century BC. However, none of the architectural finds at Kaunos itself dates back to earlier than the 4th century BC.

=== First Persian rule ===
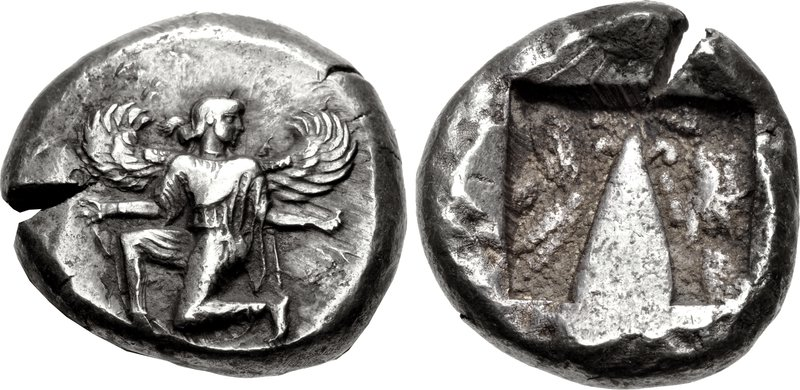
Coinage of Kaunos at the time of tyrant Pisindelis. Circa 470-450 BC.

Kaunos is first referred to by Herodotus in his book Histories. He narrates that the Persian general Harpagus marches against the Lycians, Carians and Kaunians during the Persian invasion of 546 BCE. Herodotus writes that the Kaunians fiercely countered Harpagus' attacks but were ultimately defeated. Despite the fact that the Kaunians themselves said they originated from Crete,. He thought it was far more likely that the Kaunians were the original inhabitants of the area because of the similarity between his own Carian language and that of the Kaunians. He added that there were, however, great differences between the lifestyles of the Kaunians and those of their neighbours, the Carians and Lycians. One of the most conspicuous differences being their social drinking behaviour. It was common practice that the villagers -men, women and children alike- had get-togethers over a good glass of wine.

Herodotus mentions that Kaunos participated in the Ionian Revolt (499–494 BCE).

Some important inscriptions in Carian language were found here, dating to c. 400 BC, including a bilingual inscription in Greek and Carian found in 1996. They helped to decipher the Carian alphabets.

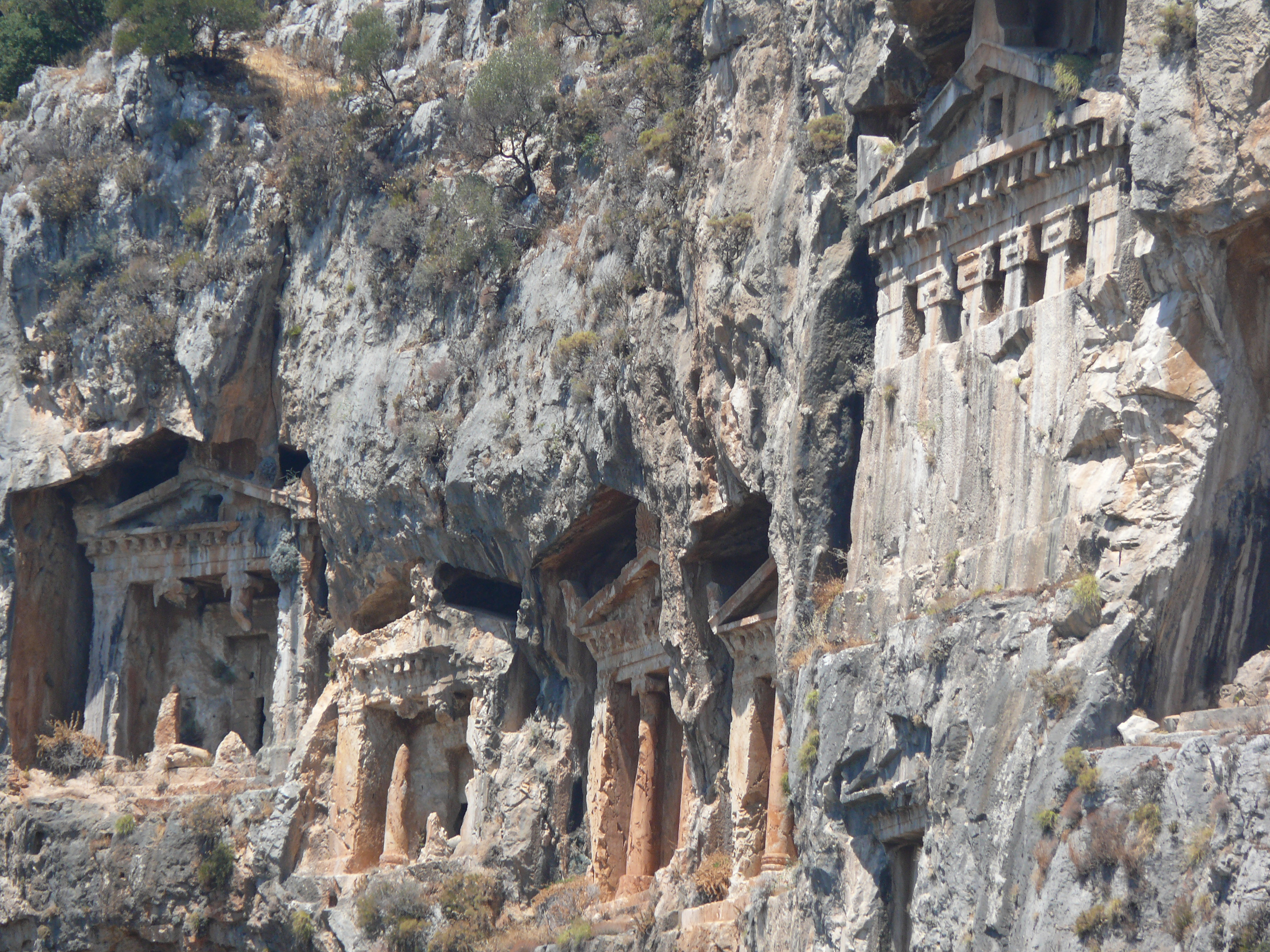
Kaunos rock graves.

=== Greek influences ===
After Xerxes I was beaten in the Second Persian War and the Persians were gradually withdrawn from the western Anatolian coast, Kaunos joined the Delian League. Initially they only had to pay 1 talent of tax, an amount that was raised by factor 10 in 425 BC. This indicates that by then the city had developed into a thriving port, possibly due to increased agriculture and the demand for Kaunian export articles, such as salt, salted fish, slaves, pine resin and black mastic – the raw materials for tar used in boat building and repair – and dried figs. During the 5th and 4th centuries BC the city started to use the name Kaunos as an alternative for its ancient name Kbid, because of the increased Hellenistic influence. The myth about the foundation of the city probably dates back to this period.

During the Peloponnesian War, both sides used Kaunos as a port.

=== Second Persian rule ===
After the Peace of Antalcidas in 387 BC, Kaunos again came under Persian rule. During the period that Kaunos was annexed and added to the province of Caria by the Persian rulers, the city was drastically changed. This was particularly the case during the reign of the satrap Mausolos (377–353 BC). The city was enlarged, was modeled with terraces and walled over a huge area. The city gradually got a Greek character, with an agora and temples dedicated to Greek deities. Alexander the Great's 334 BC brought the city under the rule of the Macedonian empire.

=== Hellenistic period and Roman rule ===
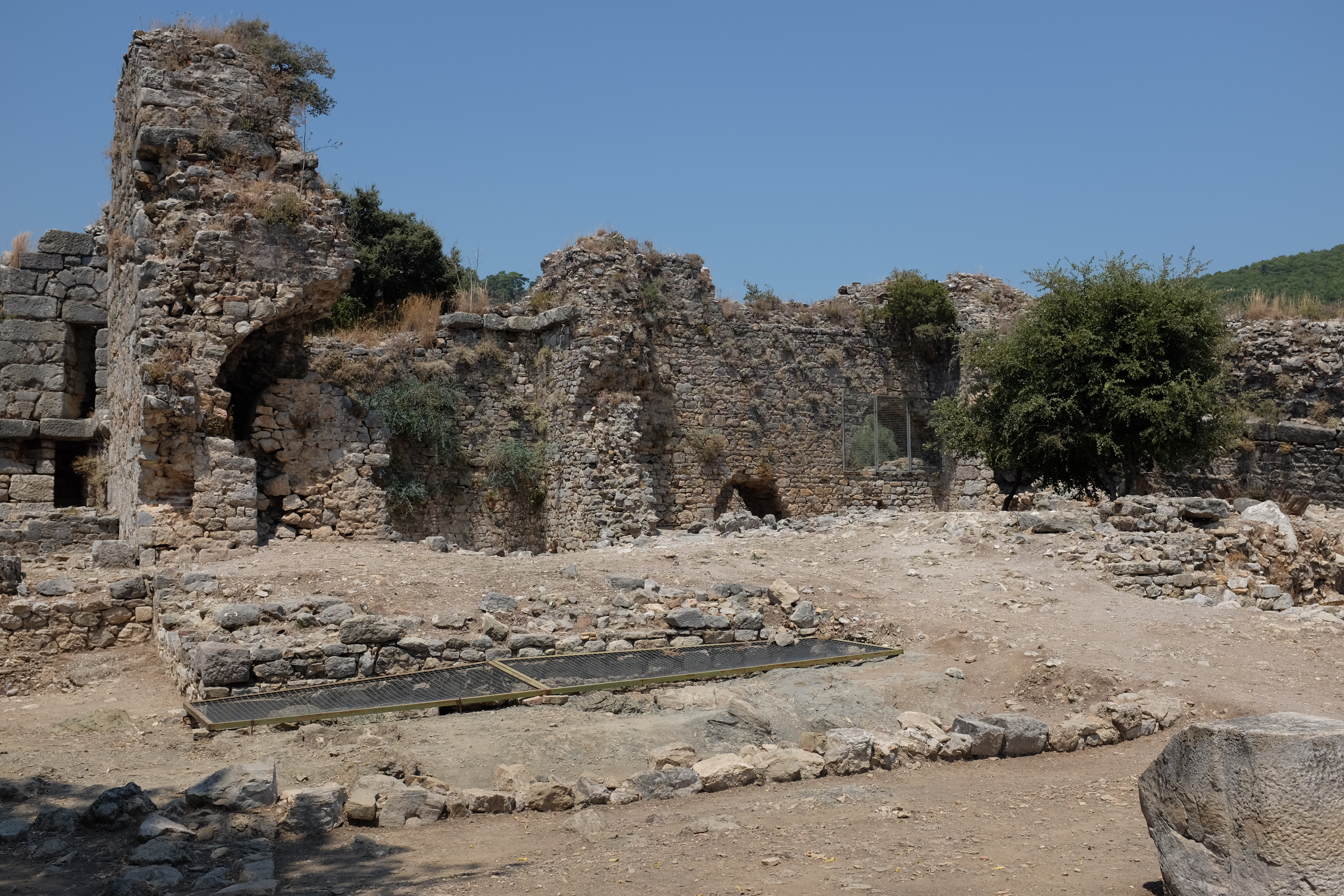
Roman baths

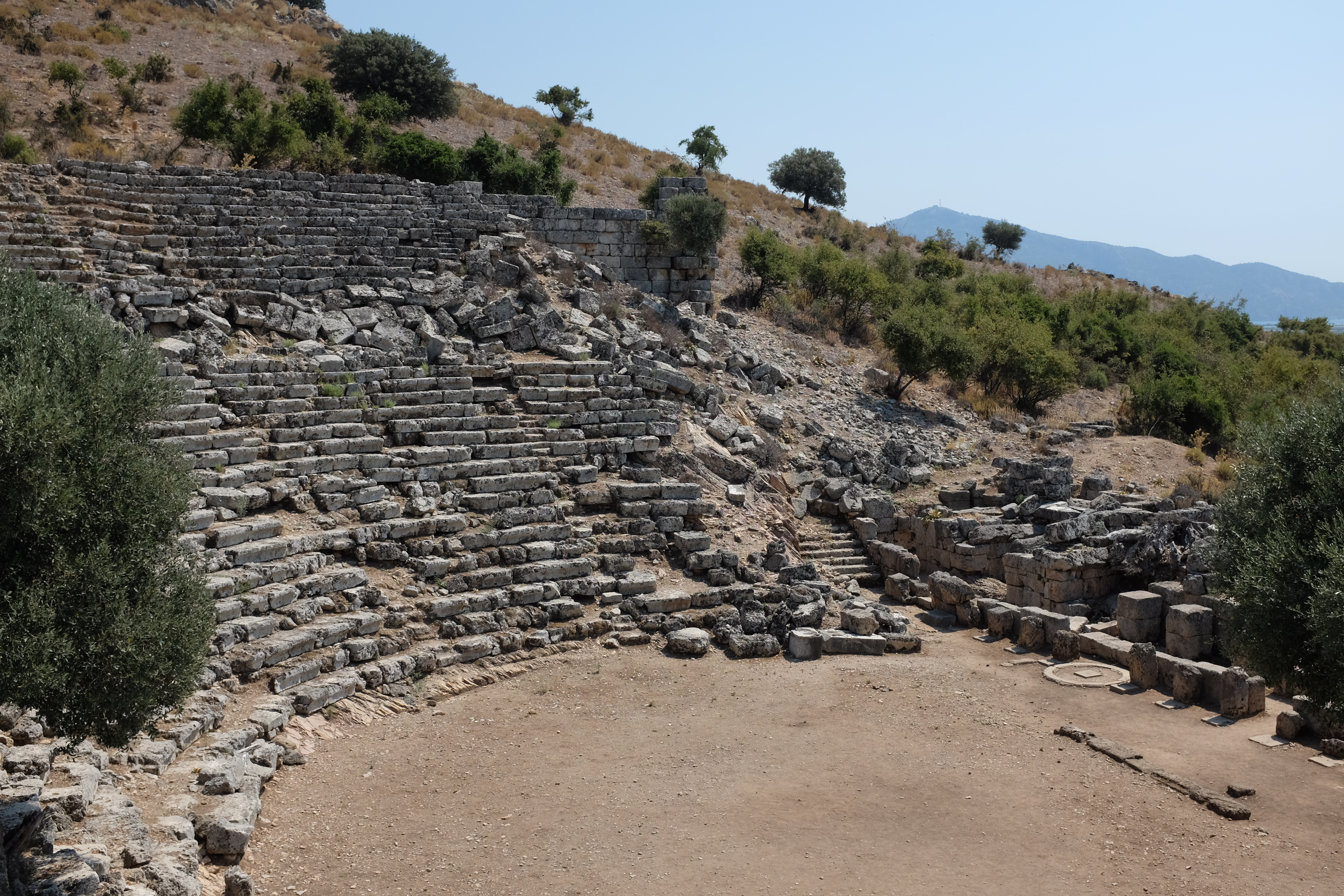
Theatre

After Alexander's death, Kaunos, due to its strategic location, was disputed among the Diadochi, changing hands between the Antigonus I Monophthalmus, Lysimachus, Demetrius I Poliorcetes and Ptolemies.

In the early 2nd century BC, Rhodes bought Kaunos from Ptolemy's generals for 200 talents. Because of differences between the Hellenistic kingdoms, the Roman Republic was able to expand its influence in the area and annex a considerable number of Hellenistic kingdoms.

The city remained reluctantly under Rhodian control until 167 BC. In 167 BC there was a revolt by Kaunos and a number of other cities in western Anatolia against Rhodes. As a result, Rome discharged Rhodes from its task. In 129 BC the Romans established the Province of Asia, which covered a large part of western Anatolia. Kaunos was near the edge of this province and was assigned to Lycia.

Samaritans are attested in the town during the late Hellenistic period. Evidence includes an inscription dedicated by a Samaritan family; the father, Simon, is identified as originating from Shechem, while the other family members bear Greek names, including Dionysia and Cleopatra.

In 88 BC Mithridates invaded the province, trying to curb further expansion by the Romans. The Kaunians teamed up with him and killed all the Roman inhabitants of their city. After the peace of 85 BC they were punished for this action by the Romans, who again put Kaunos under Rhodian administration. By the end of the 1st century BC, Kaunos was once again independent, although Dio Chrysostom suggests that the Rhodians later reestablished some form of control over the city. During Roman rule Kaunos became a prospering sea port. The amphitheater of the city was enlarged and Roman baths and a palaestra were built. The agora fountain was renovated and new temples arose.

=== Byzantine era ===
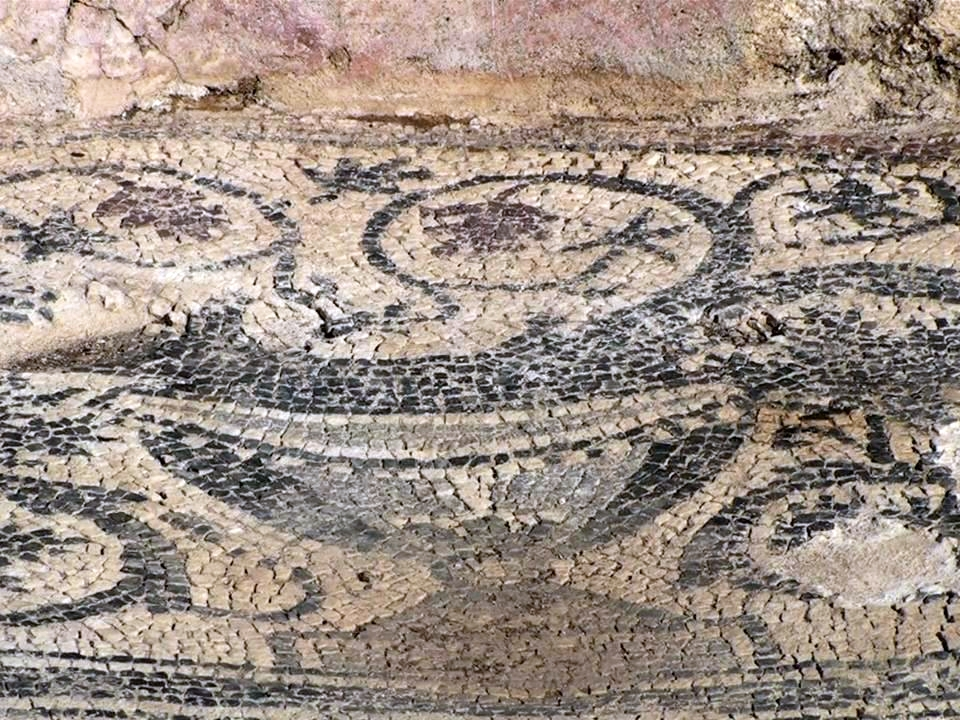
Mosaics next to the domed Byzantine basilica

Kaunos was christianized at an early date and when the Roman Empire officially adopted the Christian faith, its name changed into Caunos-Hegia.

During the Byzantine period, Kaunos was part of Lycia, its bishop held the 15th position in rank under the metropolitan of Myra.

=== Decline of Kaunos ===
From 625 AD onwards Kaunos was faced with attacks by Muslim Arabs and pirates. The 13th century brought invasions by Turkish beyliks. Consequently, the old castle on the acropolis was fortified with walls, giving it a typical medieval appearance. In the 14th century the Turkish beyliks had conquered part of Caria, which resulted in a dramatic decrease in sea trade.

The resulting economic slump caused many Kaunians to move elsewhere. In the 15th century the Turks captured the entire area north of Caria and Kaunos was hit by a malaria epidemic. This caused the city to be abandoned. The ancient city was badly devastated in an earthquake and gradually got covered with sand and a dense vegetation. The city was forgotten until Richard Hoskyn, a Royal Navy surveyor found a law tablet, referring to the Council of Kaunos and the inhabitants of this city. Hoskyn visited the ruins in 1840 and published his account in 1842, making knowledge of the ancient city once more available.

== Ecclesiastical history ==
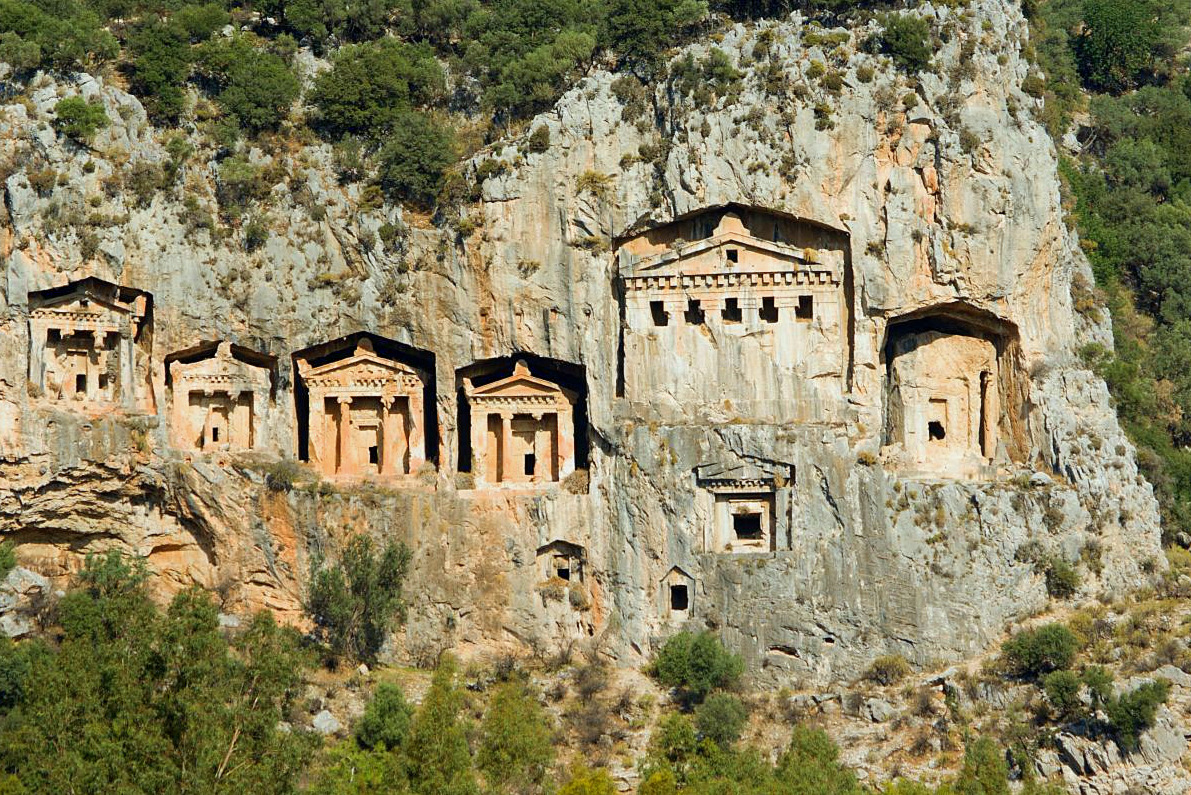
Kaunian rock tombs in Hellenistic style

Residential Bishops are known beginning from the 4th century. Four bishops are mentioned by Lequien:

- Basil, who attended the Council of Seleucia in 359;
- Antipater, who attended the Council of Chalcedon in 451;
- Nicolaus, who subscribed the letter to Emperor Leo in 458; and
- Stephanus, who attended the Council of Nicaea in 787.

The Synecdemus of Hierocles and most Notitiae Episcopatuum, as late as the 12th or 13th century, place it in Lycia, as a suffragan of Myra.

=== Titular see ===
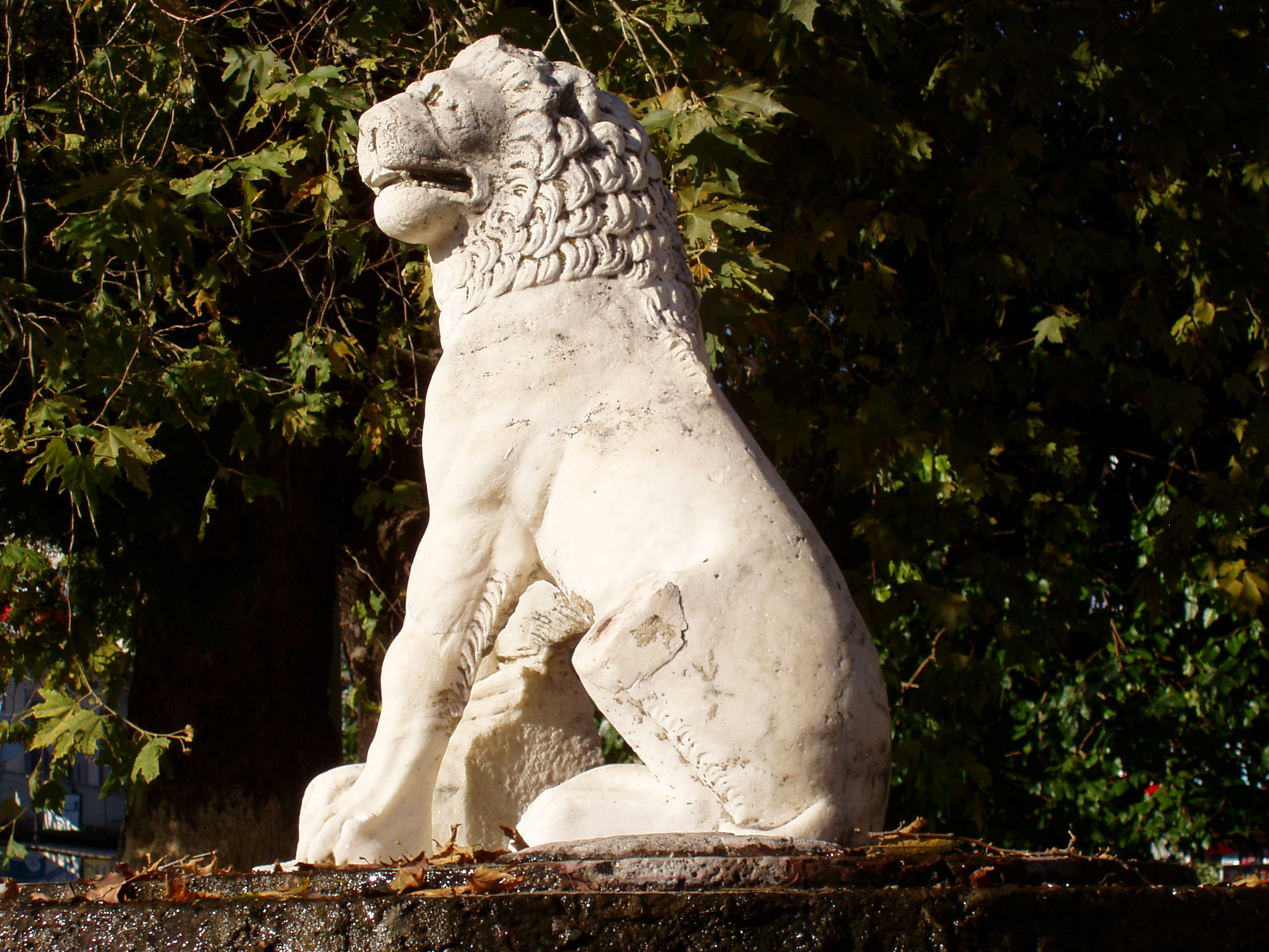
The statue of the Lion of Kaunos was found during illegal excavations at Kaunos in 1965 and brought to Koycegiz

The see is included, under the Latinized form of its name, Caunus, among the Latin titular bishoprics recognized by the Catholic Church. since it was nominally restored (no later than 1911), as a suffragan of the Lycian Metropolitan of the capital's Archdiocese of Myra.

It vacant since 1972, having had the following incumbents, both of the fitting Episcopal (lowest) rank :

- Juvencio Juan Hospital de la Puebla, Augustinians (born Spain) (18 September 1911 – death 4 October 1957), as Apostolic Vicar of Northern Hunan 湖南北境 (China) (1911.09.18 – 1917.03) and on emeritate
- Angelo Barbisotti, Sons of the Sacred Heart of Jesus (F.S.C.J.) (born Italy) (14 November 1957 – death 17 September 1972) as Apostolic Vicar of Esmeraldas (Ecuador) (1957.11.14 – 1972.09.17).

== Main archeological sites ==
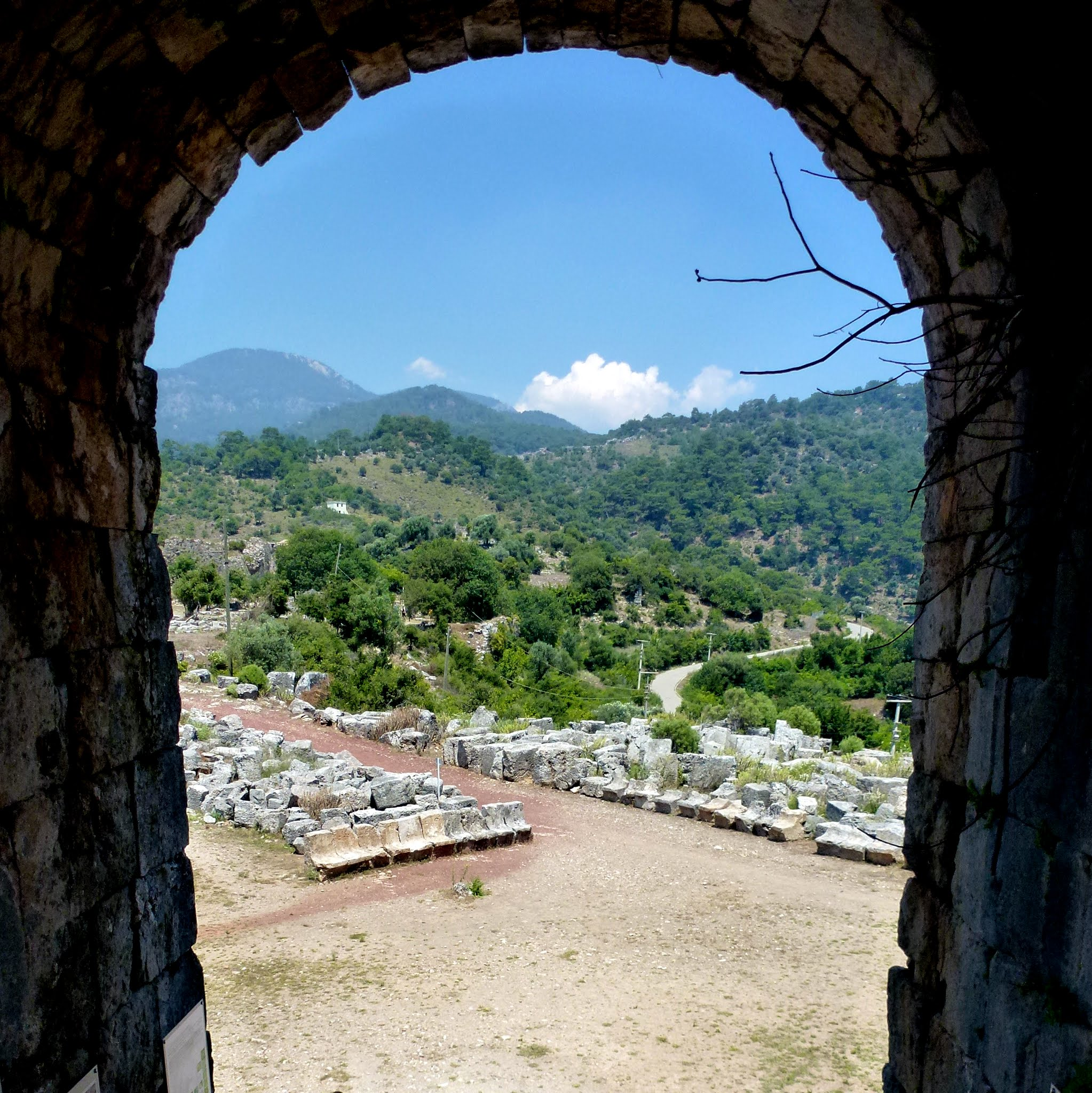
The site of Kaunos

Kaunos is a site that is interesting for both its archeological and ecological importance. Situated in the Köyceğiz-Dalyan Special Environmental Protection Area, it offers outstanding vistas and is rich in wildlife. The ruins of the city are near Dalyan, on the west bank of the ancient Kalbis river. The main sights at the archeological site itself are:

- The Acropolis (Persikon), situated on a 152 m high rock, fortified with Byzantine walls. The city's acropolis was called Imbros and it lay at the foot of Mount Tarbelos (present-day "Mount Ölemez").

Adjacent to the acropolis is a smaller fortification, called Heraklion. Until the 5th century BC this 50 m high cape reached into sea and there were two ports south and north of it. From the Acropolis there are views of the ancient city, Dalyan, the Dalyan river, the estuary and İztuzu Beach. The small fortification looks down on a traditional dalyan (fishing weir) situated quite near the former southern port.

- The theater on the slope of the acropolis featuring both Hellenistic and Roman characteristics

The theater has a diameter of 75 m and was built at a 27-degree angle. It had a capacity for 5000 spectators and is in a fairly good state. It is still occasionally used for performances.

- The palaestra with its Roman baths, a wind measuring platform and a domed Byzantine basilica

Archaeological research has shown that the palaestra was built over part of the old city that most probably had been a place of worship.
The Roman baths served as a social meeting place and were meant to impress the Kaunians — by their sheer dimensions — of the power of the Roman Empire. In the Byzantine era the baths were dismantled and the frigidarium was re-used as a church. The wind-measuring platform dates back to 150 BC and was used for city planning. According to the archeologists Öğün and Işık, it must have consisted of a circular building with a base diameter of 15.80 m and a top diameter of 13.70 m. The building has collapsed, however, probably as a result of an earthquake. The measuring method is therefore not quite clear. In his De architectura the Roman architect Vitruvius stated that wind-measuring platforms were used to plan streets in accordance with the prevailing wind direction, in order to keep the air in cities clean. The domed Byzantine basilica on the palaestra terrace dates back to the 5th century AD. It was made with building materials taken from previous buildings on a foundation belonging to a 4th-century building that was probably also used as a place of worship. The archeologist team think that its inner walls were plastered and decorated with frescoes. The domed basilica is the only remaining Byzantine edifice in Kaunos that still stands. Next to the basilica mosaics have been uncovered.

- The port agora, the stoa and the nymphaeum

The port agora is located at the flat area in front of Sülüklü Lake. It dates back to the 4th century BC and kept its function as an economic, political and social meeting place until the end of the Roman era. The remains of pedestals indicate that there must have been many (bronze) statues of influential Romans, but these have not been found. Most likely these were melted down in the Byzantine era, for the archeologists found a smelting furnace of that period near to the pedestal of a bronze equestrial statue of the Roman governor of Asia, Lucius Licinius Murena. The covered stoa at the north side of the agora offered sun and rain protection. The stoa was created in the early Hellenistic era (3rd century BC), but part dates to the early Roman era. The Nympheon is also Hellenistic, but the fountain basin was extended during the Roman era. Inscriptions from the period of Emperor Hadrian reveal that the toll for merchants and boat owners was relaxed to compensate for the gradually silting port.

- The temples

Six temples have been excavated, two of Hellenistic and four of Roman origin. Probably the terrace temple of the 3rd century BC facing a circle of columns has the greatest appeal. Inside the circle an obelisk has been found, which is also depicted on old Kaunian coins. The obelisk was the symbol of king Kaunos, who according to mythology established the ancient city bearing his name.

Outside the official Kaunos archeological site, there are:

- Six rock tombs on the Dalyan river (4th – 2nd century BC), which are Dalyan's prime sight

The façades of the rock tombs resemble the fronts of Hellenistic temples with two Ionian pillars, a triangular pediment, an architrave with toothed friezes, and acroterions shaped like palm leaves.

- The Kaunos city walls

The spectacular Kaunos city walls were erected during the reign of Mausolos in the 4th century BC. They are extraproportional in relation to the size of Kaunos and its population, presumably because the satrap had high expectations of the city's future as a marine and commercial port. The city walls start west of the inner port and run along the hills N and NW of the city, to the top of the steep cliff opposite Dalyan centre. There is a walking track along the wall, starting at the Çandır water station. The regularly-shaped rectangular blocks and the way the blocks have been positioned give a fine impression of Hellenistic building techniques. Parts of the wall are well-kept, other parts have been taken down and rebuilt.

- The niche tombs at the port of Çandır

Kaunos is surrounded by ancient necropoli, because the ancient Greeks and Romans always buried their deceased at considerable distance from their homes. The niche tombs were the most common ones. The ashes of the deceased were put in urns and then placed in a niche. At the port of Çandır, some km beyond the archeological site of Kaunos, there are tens of niche tombs hewn from the rock of Kızıltepe.

== Notable people ==
- Protogenes, Greek painter, 4th century BC
- Zeno of Kaunos, secretary in Ptolemaic service, 3rd century BC

== Sources ==
- Bean, George E. (2002). Turkey beyond the Maeander. London: Frederick A. Praeger. ISBN 0-87471-038-3.
