= June Haimoff =

English environmentalist (1922–2022)

June Haimoff MBE
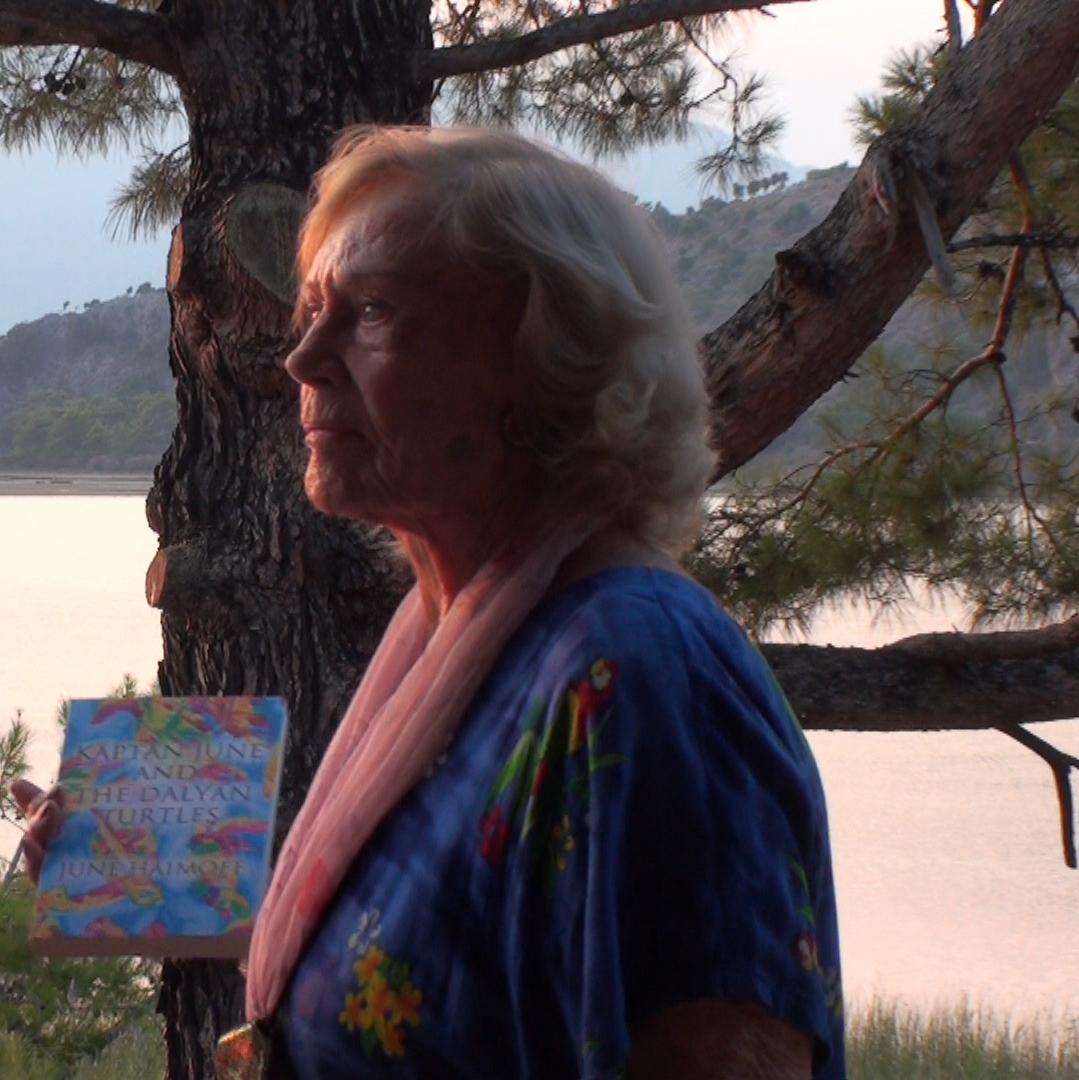
- Haimoff at the sea turtle centre at İztuzu Beach
- Born: Joan Christine Fairey; 27 December 1922; Essex, England
- Died: 23 April 2022 (aged 99); Dalyan, Turkey
- Occupation: Environmentalist

June Haimoff (MBE) (27 December 1922 – 23 April 2022) was an English environmentalist who lived in Dalyan in the Turkish province of Muğla. In the period from 1984 to 1988 she and fellow-environmentalists such as David Bellamy, Lily Venizelos, Günther Peter, Nergis Yazgan and Keith Corbett launched a successful campaign to preserve İztuzu Beach as a habitat for the endangered loggerhead turtle (Caretta caretta). This beach is one of the main nesting places of the species in Turkey and the Mediterranean.

== Background ==
June Haimoff was born in Essex as Joan Christine Fairey, daughter of Christopher and Madeleine Fairey. As her father was a prominent petroleum engineer, the family often lived abroad (a.o. in Uganda and Iran).

In her adult life, she pursued the ambition of becoming an opera singer and did her studies in music, dancing and ballet. When married with Charles Haimoff, she was seriously engaged in painting and had her own art gallery in Gstaad, Switzerland.

June Haimoff died of multiple organ failure in Dalyan on 23 April 2022, where she had been living since 1987.

== Conservation campaign ==
She visited southwestern Turkey for the first time in July 1975, when the region was still outside the usual tracks of international tourism, by means of a boat (Bouboulina) purchased in Greece.

Between 1975 and 1981 she occasionally stopped at İztuzu Beach and Dalyan on her boat trips and was therefore called "Kaptan June" (Captain June) by the locals. In 1984 she settled in Dalyan in her own baraka (beach hut) on İztuzu Beach.

When it became clear that there were plans to exploit the beach for mass tourism, she started a campaign to preserve İztuzu Beach as a breeding habitat for the loggerhead turtle, which is on the IUCN Red List.

In April 1987 building started on an 1800-bed hotel complex by the name of Kaunos Beach Hotel. This caused a storm of protests world-wide. There were protests from the IUCN, Greenpeace, the World Wildlife Fund and the Zoologische Gesellschaft Frankfurt. Particularly in the former Federal Republic of Germany the building caused a major uproar, because the German DEG (Deutsche Finanzierungsgesellschaft für Beteiligungen in Entwicklungsländern) wanted to use an amount equivalent to 5 million euros from public means under the pretense of development aid.

June Haimoff approached the WWF and consequently Prince Philip—then President—asked the Turkish Prime Minister Turgut Özal for a moratorium, while awaiting the outcome of an Environmental Impact Assessment. In the meantime the German Federal Government had forbidden DEG to invest development aid money for the building of the Kaunos Beach Hotel.

The project was stopped in September 1987 and in 1988 the Turkish government decided to forbid future building at the beach. The Köyceğiz-Dalyan region then obtained the status of Special Environmental Protection Area (SEPA).

Afterwards, June Haimoff dedicated her efforts to assure conservation of the site as well as for attracting international attention to the fate of the turtles ".

She herself related the struggle and the victory for the preservation of the turtle species in her book titled "Kaptan June and the Turtles" published for the first time in 1997. A second edition published in 2002 and titled, this time, "Kaptan June and the Dalyan Turtles", featuring a new prologue, two additional chapters, bringing the story up to date, and an index.

Lately June Haimoff pursued her efforts in a wider frame, and was also concerned with the preservation of the nature in a more general sense with focus on the unique flora and fauna of the Köyceğiz-Dalyan Special Environmental Protection Area. She was particularly concerned for the protection of the soft-shelled Nile Turtle and the Oriental Sweetgum trees (Liquidambar orientalis), another endemic species proper to the region.

== Turtle Conservation Foundation ==
In 2009 June Haimoff took an exam to obtain Turkish citizenship to start a foundation to protect the habitat of the loggerhead turtle. The Kaptan June Sea Turtle Conservation Foundation was officially established in February 2011 and has its Information Centre and Museum in Kaptan June's Hut at the minibus side of the beach, overlooking the place where the building of the Kaunos Beach Hotel started in April 1987.

Her work was recognised by Queen Elizabeth II in the 2011 British New Year's Honors List.

June Haimoff lived until her death in Dalyan in a traditional Turkish house, named "The Peaceable Kingdom". She lived a very active life, supported by many friends and surrounded by her many dogs and cats.

== Sources ==
- First edition: June Haimoff (foreworded by David Bellamy) (1997). Kaptan June and the Turtles. Janus Publishing Company. ISBN 1-85756-229-1.
- Second edition: June Haimoff (foreworded by David Bellamy) (2002). Kaptan June and the Dalyan Turtles. Hardinge Simpole. ISBN 978-1-84382-068-0.
- Breakfast with Kaptan June by June Haimoff
