= Eleftherios Venizelos (politician, born 1924) =

Greek politician (1924–2026)

Lefteris Venizelos
- Λευτέρης Βενιζέλος

Member of the Hellenic Parliament for Chania
- In office 16 November 1952 – 11 May 1958

10th president of AEK Athens
- In office 3 November 1953 – 7 October 1954
- Preceded by: Georgios Melas
- Succeeded by: Georgios Chrysafidis

Personal details
- Born: August 1924 Athens, Greece
- Died: 7 February 2026 (aged 101) Athens, Greece
- Party: Liberal
- Spouse: Lili Harami (m. 1954)
- Children: 1
- Education: Athens University of Economics and Business
- Occupation: Shipowner

Eleftherios "Lefteris" Venizelos (Greek: Ελευθέριος «Λευτέρης» Βενιζέλος; August 1924 – 7 February 2026) was a Greek politician and shipowner. A member of the Liberal Party, he served in the Hellenic Parliament from 1952 to 1958. He was the president of AEK Athens F.C. from November 1953 to October 1954.

Venizelos died in Athens on 7 February 2026, at the age of 101.
