= Philiscus of Corcyra =

Philiscus of Corcyra (Ancient Greek: Φιλίσκος ὁ Κερκυραῖος), or Philicus, was a distinguished tragic poet, and one of the seven who formed the Tragic Pleiad, was also a priest of Dionysus, and in that character he was present at the coronation procession of Ptolemy II Philadelphus in 284 BC. Pliny states that his portrait was painted in the attitude of meditation by Protogenes, who is known to have been still alive in 304 BC. It seems, therefore, that the time of Philiscus must be extended to an earlier period than that assigned to him by the Suda, who merely says that he lived under Ptolemy Philadelphus. He wrote 42 dramas, of which we know nothing, except that the Themistocles, which is enumerated among the plays of Philiscus of Athens the comic poet, ought probably to be ascribed to him : such subjects are known to have been chosen by the tragedians, as in the Marathonians of Lycophron. The choriambic hexameter verse was named after Philiscus, on account of his frequent use of it (Hephaestion . p. 53). There is much dispute whether the name should be written, Φιλίσκος or Φίλικος, but the former appears to be the true form, though he himself, for the sake of metre, used the latter.

Spyridon (Filiskos) Samaras from Corcyra, the composer of the Olympic Hymn was named after Philiscus.
