= Protogenes =

Ancient Greek painter

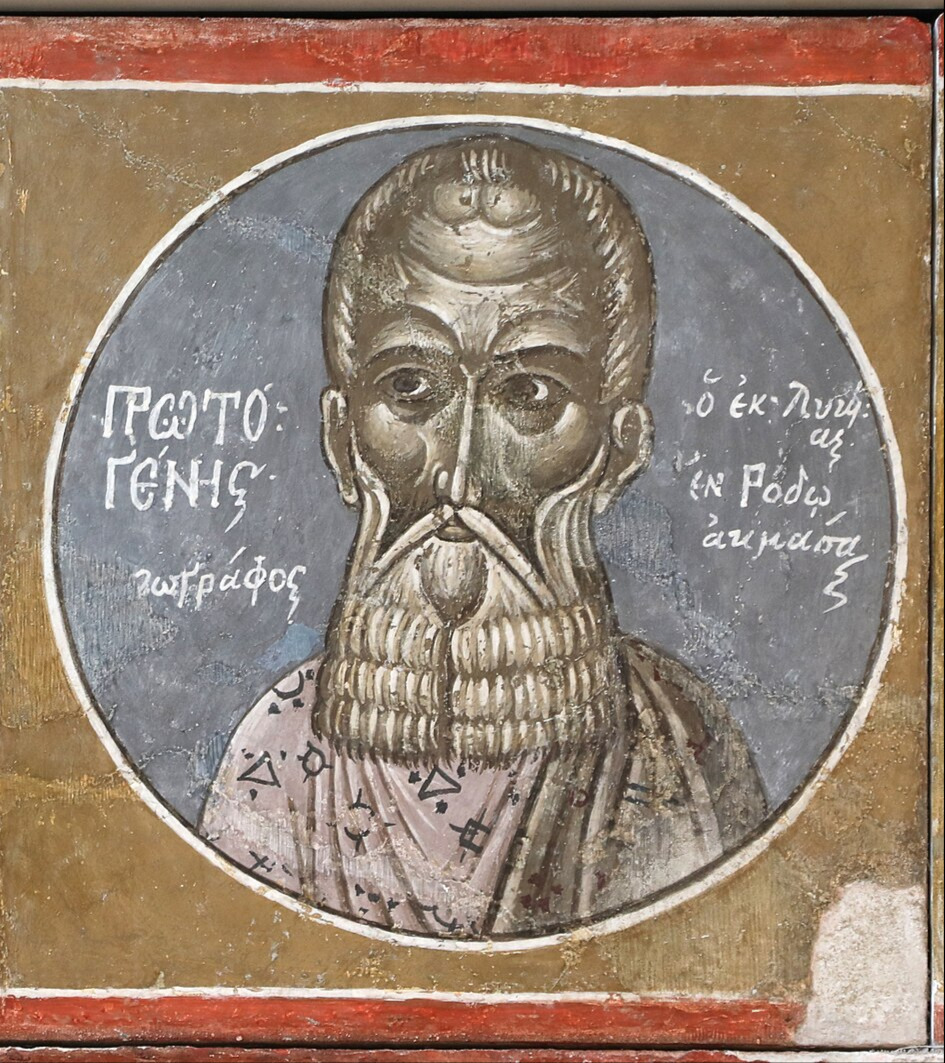
- Fresco by Photis Kontoglou
- Born: 4th century BC; Kaunos, Caria
- Died: 3rd century BC; Rhodes
- Known for: Painting

Protogenes (/proʊˈtɒdʒəˌniːz/; Greek: Πρωτογένης; fl. 4th century BC) was an ancient Greek painter, a contemporary rival of Apelles. As with the other famous ancient Greek painters, none of his work has survived, and it is known only from literary references and (brief) descriptions.

== Biography ==
Protogenes was born in Caunus, on the coast of Caria but resided in Rhodes during the latter half of the 4th century BC. He was celebrated for the minute and laborious finish which he bestowed on his pictures, both in drawing and in color. Apelles, his great rival, standing astonished in presence of one of these works, could console himself only by saying that it was wanting in charm.

Pliny the Elder, in his Natural History, relates the story of a contest between Apelles and Protogenes: 'Apelles sailed [to Rhodes], eager to see the works of a man known to him only by reputation, and on his arrival immediately repaired to the studio. Protogenes was not at home, but a solitary old woman was keeping watch over a large panel placed on the easel. In answer to the questions of Apelles, she said that Protogenes was out and asked the name of the visitor. "Here it is," said Apelles, and snatching up a brush he drew a line of extreme delicacy across the board. On the return of Protogenes, the old woman told him what had happened. When he had considered the delicate precision of the line he at once declared that his visitor had been Apelles, for no one else could have drawn anything so perfect. Then in another colour he drew a second still finer line upon the first, and went away, bidding her show it to Apelles if he came again, and add that this was the man he was seeking. It fell out as he expected; Apelles did return, and, ashamed to be beaten, drew a third line of another colour cutting the two first down their length and leaving no room for any further refinement. Protogenes owned himself beaten and hurried down to the harbour to find his visitor; they agreed to hand down the painting just as it was to posterity, a marvel to all, but especially to artists.' This panel was seen by Pliny (N.H. xxxv. 83) in Rome, where it was much admired, and where it perished by fire.

On one picture, the Ialysus, he spent seven years; on another, the Satyr, he worked continuously during the siege of Rhodes by Demetrius Poliorcetes (305-304 BC) notwithstanding that the garden in which he painted was in the middle of the enemy's camp. Demetrius, unsolicited, took measures for his safety. When told that the Ialysus just mentioned was in a part of the town exposed to assault, Demetrius even changed his plan of operations. Ialysus was a local hero, the founder of the town of the same name in the island of Rhodes, and probably was represented as a huntsman. This picture was still in Rhodes in the time of Cicero but was afterwards removed to Rome, where it perished in the burning of the Temple of Peace.

The picture painted during the siege of Rhodes consisted of a satyr leaning idly against a pillar on which was a figure of a partridge, so lifelike that ordinary spectators saw nothing but it. Enraged on that account, the painter wiped out the partridge. The Satyr must have been one of his last works. He would then have been about seventy years of age and had enjoyed for about twenty years a reputation next only to that of Apelles, his friend and benefactor.

In the gallery of the Propylaea at Athens was to be seen a panel by Protogenes. The subject consisted of two figures representing personifications of the coast of Attica, Paralus and Hammonias. For the council chamber at Athens, he painted figures of the Thesmothetae, but in what form or character is not known. Probably, they were executed in Athens, and it may have been then that he met Aristotle, who recommended him to take for subjects the deeds of Alexander the Great. In his Alexander and Pan, he may have followed that advice in the idealizing spirit to which he was accustomed.

To this spirit must be traced also his Cydippe and Tlepolemus, legendary personages of Rhodes. Among his portraits are mentioned those of the mother of Aristotle, Philiscus of Corcyra the tragic poet, and King Antigonus. However, Protogenes was also a sculptor to some extent, and made several bronze statues of athletes, armed figures, huntsmen and persons in the act of offering sacrifices.
