= Lily Venizelos =

Greek environmentalist (born 1933)

Lili Venizelos
- Born: Thiresia Georgia Harami; 10 April 1933 (age 93); Athens, Attica, Greece
- Occupations: Conservationist, founder and president of the Mediterranean Association to Save the Sea Turtles (MEDASSET)
- Spouse: Lefteris Venizelos (m. 1954; died 2026)
- Children: 1
- Website: medasset.org

Thiresia Georgia "Lili" Venizelos (née Harami, Greek: Θηρεσία Γεωργία «Λίλη» Βενιζέλου; born 10 April 1933) is a Greek conservationist.

She founded the international NGO MEDASSET (MEDiterranean Association to Save the SEa Turtles) in 1988 and continues to serve as its president. For her efforts to protect and preserve sea turtles in the Mediterranean Sea, Venizelos received several distinctions, including United Nations Environment Programme (UNEP)'s Global 500 Roll of Honour and membership of the International Union for Conservation of Nature (IUCN) Marine Turtle Specialist Group.

== Early life ==
Venizelos mostly grew up on the island of Hydra in the Attica region. From an early age she was interested in nature. In 1974, Venizelos first visited Laganas Bay on Zakynthos Island, which would later become the National Marine Park of Zakynthos.

Venizelos was married to Eleftherios Venizelos until his death on 2026. They lived in Athens.

== Career ==
Laganas Bay on Zakynthos Island is the largest nesting ground for the endangered loggerhead sea turtle (Caretta caretta) in the Mediterranean. Since the 1970s/1980s, the nesting beaches were increasingly threatened by tourism development. Venizelos then started lobbying the Greek government for the sea turtle's protection, until the National Marine Park of Zakynthos was established in 1999 as the first national marine park in Greece.

In 1987, a planned hotel development on İztuzu Beach in southwestern Turkey was going to threaten breeding grounds for the loggerhead sea turtle. Several conservationists, including June Haimoff, David Bellamy, Peter Günther, Nergis Yazgan, Lily Venizelos and Keith Corbett, achieved that a moratorium was called. One year later, the area was declared the Köyceğiz-Dalyan Special Environmental Protection Area.

Beginning in 1983, Venizelos founded the Mediterranean Association to Save the Sea Turtles (MEDASSET), established in the United Kingdom in 1988 and in Greece in 1993. MEDASSET is active in the study and conservation of sea turtles and their habitats in the Mediterranean. The international NGO engages in research, education, lobbying, and awareness raising. It is a partner to the UNEP Mediterranean Action Plan, and a Permanent Observer-Member to the Berne Convention on the Conservation of European Wildlife and Natural Habitats, Council of Europe. As president of MEDASSET, Venizelos has authored publications and reports, given international lectures, lead campaigns, and coordinated projects.

Venizelos was awarded The Global 500 – The Roll of Honour for Environmental Achievement of the United Nations Environment Programme (UNEP) in 1987. In 2015, Venizelos received a Lifetime Achievement Award from the International Sea Turtle Society in recognition of her work for the conservation of sea turtles. Venizelos is a member of the International Union for Conservation of Nature (IUCN) Marine Turtle Specialist Group, which is regarded as "the global authority on marine turtles".

Venizelos was a scientific consultant for the documentary TV series Universum for the episode Greece – Garden of the Gods, which aired in 2005.

== Selected publications ==
- Newbury, N., Khalil, M., & Venizelos, L. (2002). Population status and conservation of marine turtles at El-Mansouri, Lebanon. Zoology in the Middle East, 27, 47 - 60.
- Venizelos, L. and Kasparek, M. (2006): Trionyx triunguis: The brackish water turtle that also lives in the Mediterranean Sea. Conference Paper. Conference: 26th Annual Symposium on Sea Turtle Biology and ConservationVolume: Frick, M., A. Panagopoulou, A. Rees and K. Williams (eds).
- White, M., Haxhiu, I., Kararaj, E., Mitro, M., Petri, L., Saçdanaku, E., Trezhnjevna, B., Boura, L., Grimanis, K., Robinson, P., & Venizelos, L. (2011). Monitoring and conservation of important sea turtle feeding grounds in the Patok Area of Albania 2008-2010: Final Project Report.
- Venizelos, L., Papapavlou, K., Dunais, M., & Lagonika, C. (2005). A review and reappraisal of research in some previously unsurveyed Mediterranean marine turtle nesting sites, 1990–2001. Belgian Journal of Zoology, 135, 271–277.
