= İztuzu Beach =

Protected Turkish beach, major breeding ground for turtles

Coordinates: 36°47′32″N 28°37′12″E

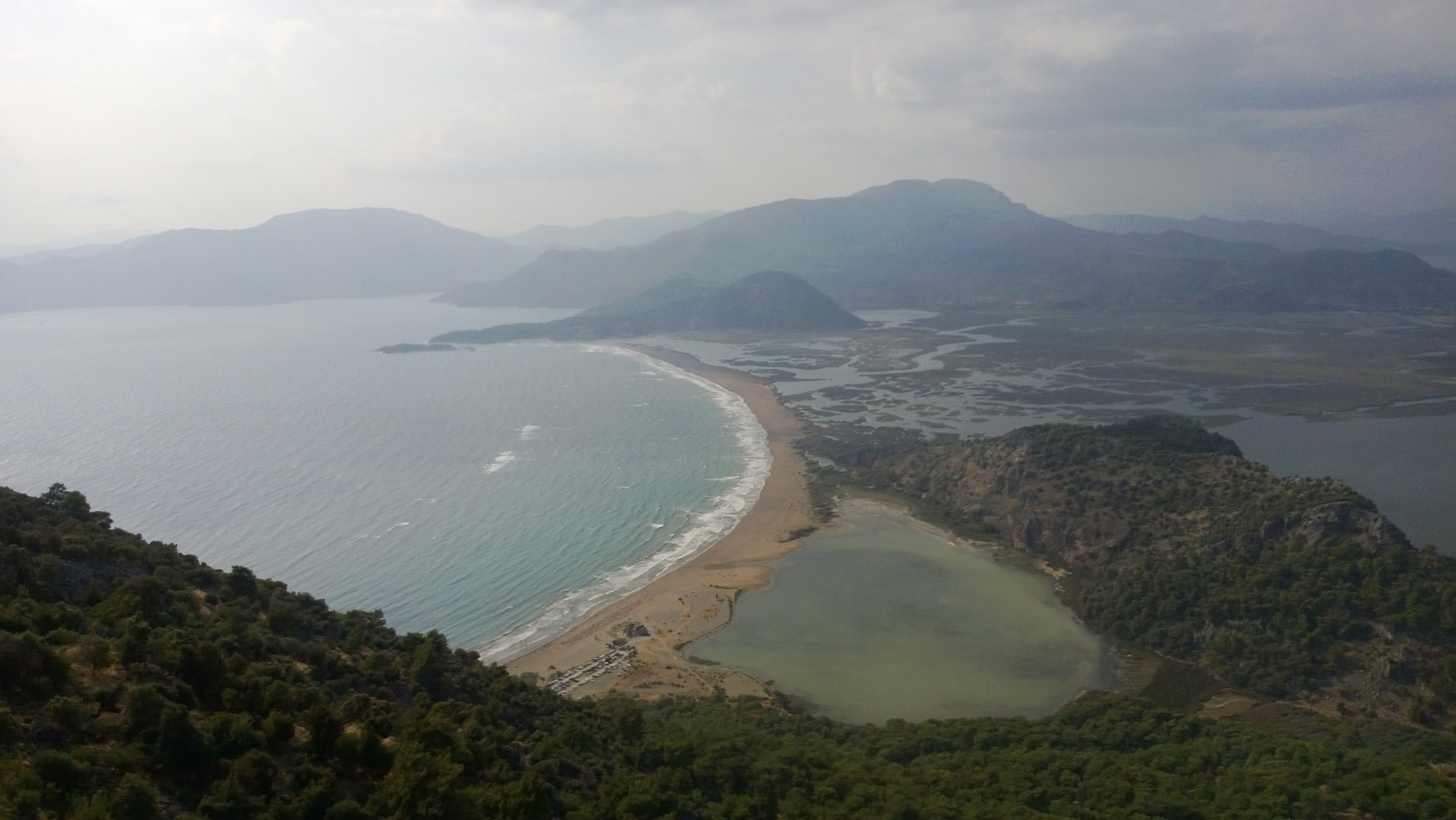
Iztuzu beach

İztuzu Beach is a 4.5 km long beach near Dalyan, in the Ortaca district of the Province of Muğla in southwestern Turkey. The beach is a narrow spit of land, which forms a natural barrier between the fresh water delta of the Dalyan river and the Mediterranean. It is one of the main breeding grounds for loggerhead sea turtles (Caretta caretta) in the Mediterranean and is therefore often referred to as Turtle Beach. The loggerhead turtle (Caretta caretta) is on the IUCN Red list of endangered animals. For this reason the beach has had a protected status since 1988 and is part of the Köyceğiz-Dalyan Special Environmental Protection Area.

The greatest threat to the survival of the loggerhead sea turtle is on these sandy beaches where its life begins. This has triggered an international conservation effort that began in the 1990s. The effort to protect loggerhead sea turtle eggs and to assure a safe breeding ground for this endangered species has made international headlines. This issue is one of the most critical items on Turkey's environmental agenda.

== History ==
From 1984 onwards there had been rumours about developing the beach for mass tourism. Plans were discussed for building a hotel and a marina at the delta side and bungalows at Küçük Dalyan at the banks of Sülüngür lake.

In 1986 the owners of the beach huts were summoned to clear and dismantle their huts by October that year.

In April 1987 the rumours about a hotel complex came true, when building started on the Kaunos Beach Hotel, an 1800-bed holiday resort to be financed with German development aid funds.

Since this would have meant the end of an important nesting habitat for the loggerhead turtle, June Haimoff, together with fellow-environmentalists such as David Bellamy, Lily Venizelos, Günther Peter, Nergis Yazgan and Keith Corbett, launched a campaign to save the beach. This started a grim international struggle between conservationists and developers. There were protests from -amongst others- the IUCN, Greenpeace, World Wildlife Fund and the Zoologische Gesellschaft Frankfurt.

Especially in the Federal Republic of Germany the building project caused great indignation, because German DEG (Deutsche Finanzierungsgesellschaft für Beteiligungen in Entwicklungsländern) wanted to claim a fund of 5 million euros worth from public means under the pretense of "development aid".

June Haimoff approached the WWF, upon which Prince Philip -then president- asked the Turkish Prime Minister Turgut Özal for a moratorium, while awaiting an Environmental impact assessment. This request was granted and building temporarily stopped. In the meantime the German Federal Government decided against the use of funds for the hotel by DEG. In July 1988 the Turkish government decided against development and gave İztuzu beach and its hinterland the Special Environmental Protection Area status.

June Haimoff has narrated the struggle to preserve İztuzu beach as a nesting habitat in her autobiographical book Kaptan June and the Turtles, that was first published in 1997. In 2001 a Turkish translation was published called Kaptan June ve Kaplumbağalar.

== Protection ==
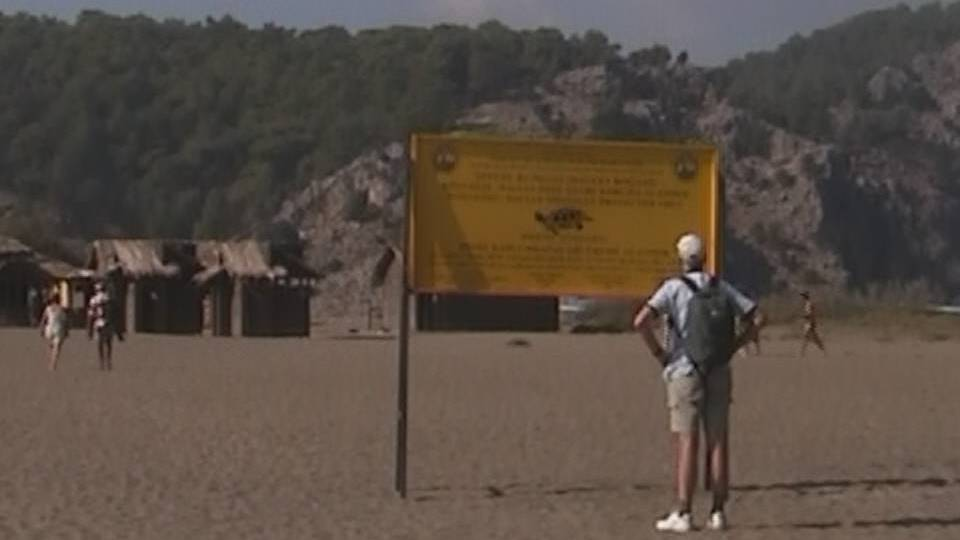
Information at İztuzu Beach

With an average of some 300 nests per year, İztuzu Beach is one of the prime nesting habitats of the loggerhead turtle in the Mediterranean. To prevent disturbance and disruption of the turtles and their nests, strict regulations have been imposed by the government since 1988:

- From 1 May - 31 October the beach is inaccessible to the public between 20.00 and 08:00, to counter sound and light disturbance
- Vehicles and animals are not allowed to enter the beach
- In the marked nesting zones parasols and sunbeds are forbidden. Neither is it allowed to lie down on towels or to dig holes.
- Speedboats are banned within a 1-mile zone from the beach and in the Dalyan delta and river.

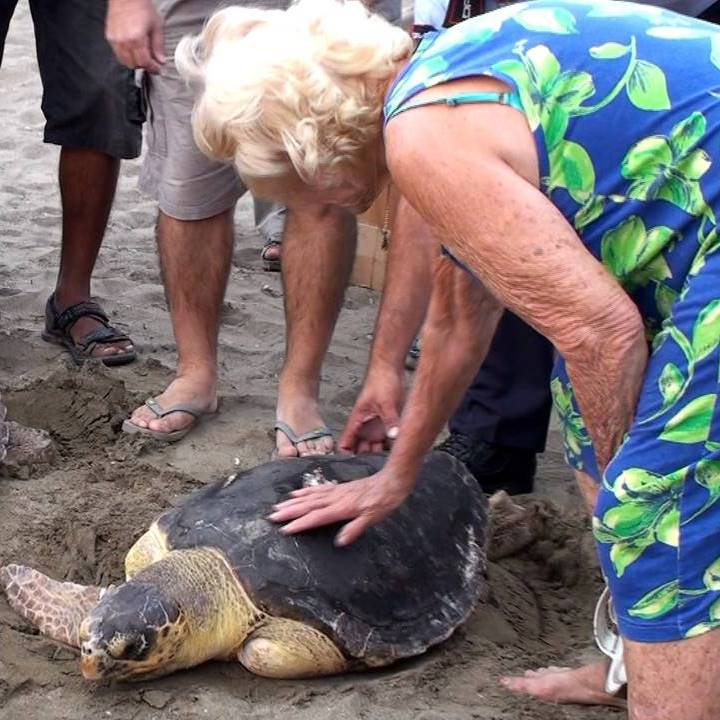
June Haimoff at the release of a rehabilitated loggerhead turtle

These measures have proven to be successful, despite the enormous increase of tourism. The monitoring programme carried out from 1988 onwards, shows a stable population and even a slight increase of nests on the beach.
In 2008, DEKAMER [tr] (Deniz Kaplumbağaları Araştırma, Kurtarma ve Rehabilitasyon Merkezi, English: Sea Turtle Research, Rescue and Rehabilitation Center) was established with the mission to conduct detailed scientific studies on sea turtle nesting beaches, provide care and treatment for injured sea turtles, and develop educational projects for the public and interested stakeholders. DEKAMER began its activities on Dalyan Beach in 2009. Every year, the organization also runs a volunteer program where participants engage in fieldwork on the beach and sometimes partake in tourist activities to inform people all around the world.

In February 2011 the Kaptan June Sea Turtle Conservation Foundation was established, a foundation whose mission is to protect sea turtles and their habitat. The former beach hut of conservationist June Haimoff has been brought back to İztuzu and has been transformed into a small museum. In May 2011 she was rewarded an MBE by Elizabeth II for her services to environmental conservation and the protection of endangered turtles in Turkey.

== International appreciation ==
In the period from 1988 onwards the Köyceğiz-Dalyan region has become a popular holiday destination. İztuzu Beach is frequented, both by people living or staying in Dalyan and by day tourists from e.g. Marmaris and Sarıgerme.
In 2008 İztuzu Beach was proclaimed winner in the category Best Open Space (Europe) by The Times because of the eco-friendly exploitation of the beach.:
In 2011 Dalyan and İztuzu Beach were proclaimed Best Beach Destination of Europe by Dutch holiday assessment website Zoover.
