= Köyceğiz-Dalyan Special Environmental Protection Area =

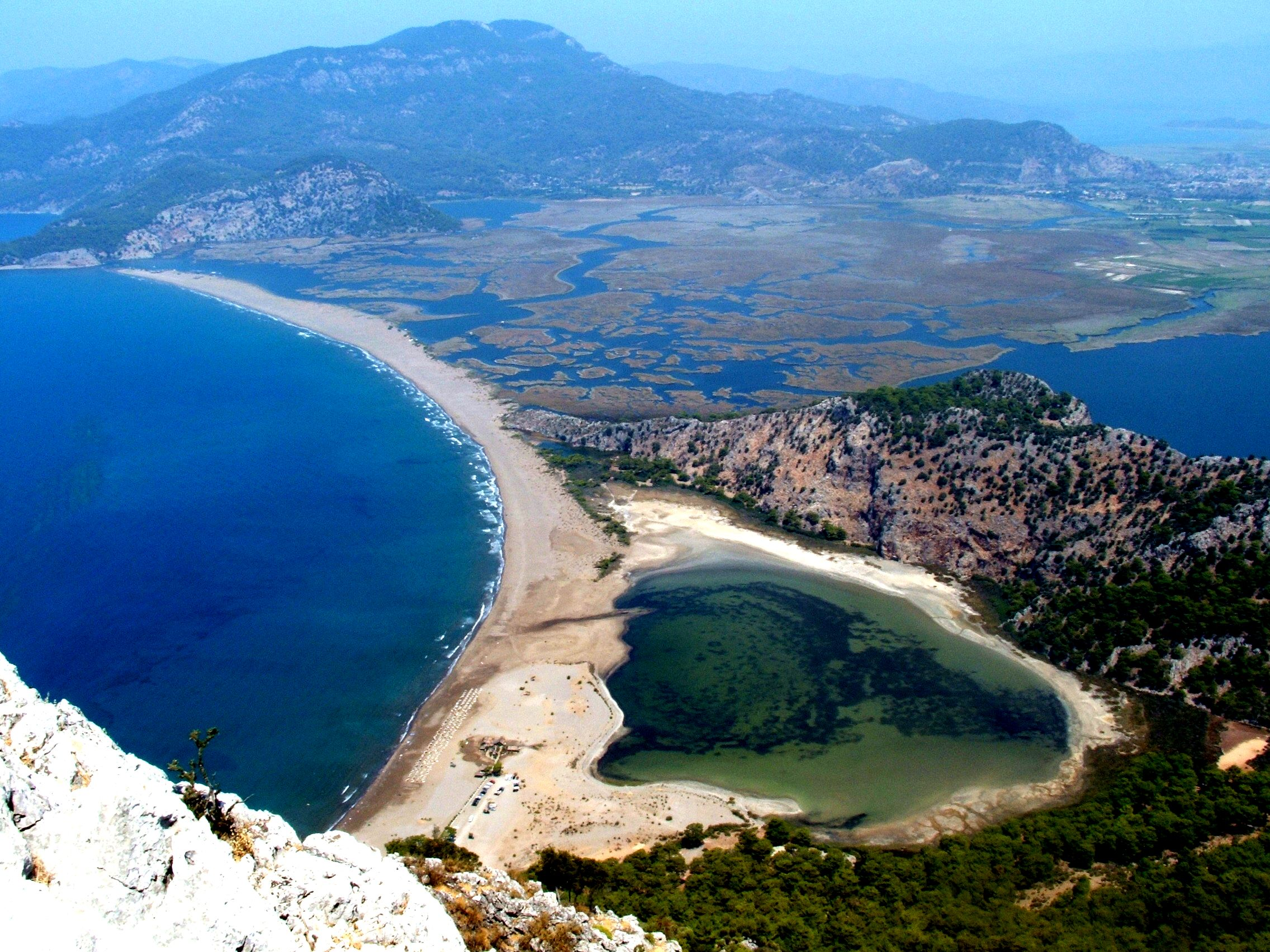
Panorama from Bozburun Tepesi (radar station above İztuzu Beach). Photo: Maria Jonker

The Köyceğiz-Dalyan Special Environmental Protection Area is a protected natural reserve in the Turkish province of Muğla. In June 1988 it was determined and declared the first protected area of its kind (Özel Çevre Koruma Bölgesi) of Turkey. In 1990 the original SPA area was extended westwards. Up to now, there are fourteen natural reserves with this status, of which Pamukkale is probably the best-known. All these areas are under the supervision of the ÖÇKK, the Turkish Environmental Protection Agency for Special Areas.

The area got its special status as a result of Prince Philip´s request to the Turkish Prime Minister Turgut Özal for a moratorium on the construction of a hotel complex at İztuzu Beach, while awaiting an environmental impact assessment. At the time Prince Philip was President of the WWF, which had been approached by environmentalists such as June Haimoff, Günther Peter, David Bellamy, Lily Venizelos, Nergis Yazgan and Keith Corbett to help stop the construction of a hotel complex at the beach. İztuzu Beach was one of the main nesting areas for the endangered loggerhead turtle (Caretta caretta), and the environmentalists were trying to preserve the turtle’s habitat. In September 1987 the construction project was suspended for an environmental impact assessment, and in 1988 the Turkish government decided upon a construction prohibition because of the area’s special significance. That was not only because of the natural importance of the beach and its significance as a turtle habitat, but also because of the cultural and historical significance and the geological importance of the Dalyan-Köyceğiz hinterland. Because of its protected status, the area offers good and ample opportunities for ecotourism and recreation. For one, the Köyceğiz-Dalyan SEPA boasts the most fantastic panoramic vistas.

From 1990 onwards the protected status of the area was elaborated in a number of sustainable environmental projects, in order to:

- protect and improve its biodiversity;
- counter environmental pollution;
- establish a balance between developments in agriculture, industry and tourism on the one hand and the environment on the other hand;
- protect the area’s ground and surface waters.

The SEPA covers an area of 461 km^{2} and includes the Köyceğiz, Toparlar, Beyobası and Dalyan districts. There are 17 settlements of which Köyceğiz on the north bank of the lake, and the tourist town of Dalyan on the river emerging from the lake are the most important ones.

== Description of the area ==
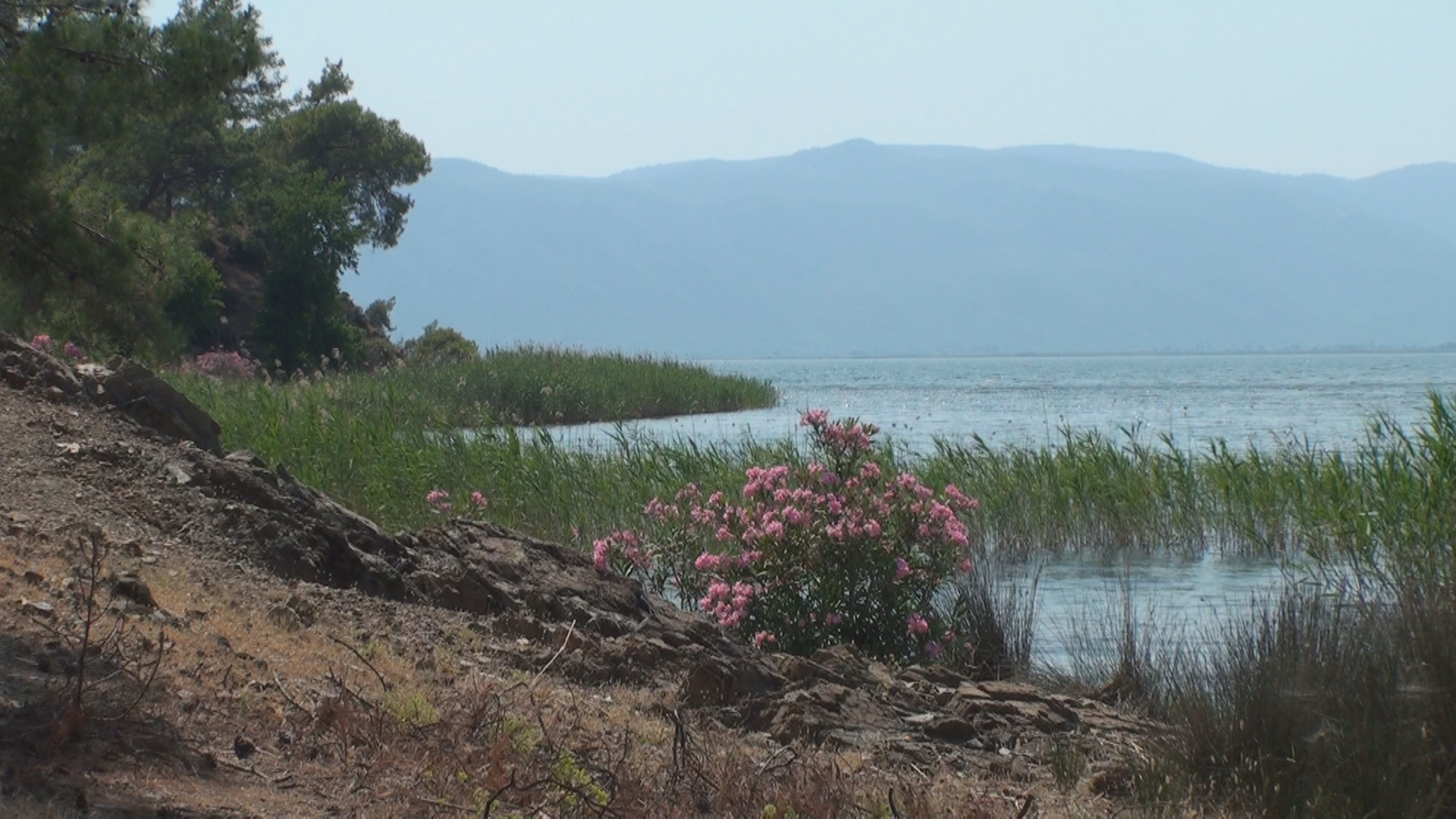
Köyceğiz Lake. Photo: Maria Jonker

The area consists of various terrestrial structures around the Köyceğiz subsidence lake.
Köyceğiz Lake is one of Turkey’s largest coastal lakes, which was formed in Antiquity as a result of the formation of a long stretch of dunes (İztuzu Beach). The lake is fed by the waters of the Namnam river in the northwest and the Yuvarlakçay in the east. The latter is reported to be an otter habitat. In the north and west some mountain streams flow into the lake.
It is the biotope variety in such a relatively small area that makes the SEPA so special. There are fresh water lakes, rivers and brooks, a vast brackish water zone in the estuary, the sea and its sandy beach. Apart from agricultural land for growing citrus fruit, sesame and cotton, there are wetlands, extensive liquidambar forests, pine forests and maquis. Around the lake there are numerous small wetlands with a rich bird population. Among the birds are the penduline tit, the Eurasian reed warbler, the great reed warbler and black-crowned night heron. The wetlands often border marshy Turkish sweetgum forests. The sweetgum forests are often intersected by ditches and frequently have an undergrowth of horse tail. The Turkish or Oriental sweetgum is an endemic species that thrives in boggy areas and is often seen in combination with plane trees. The species has traditionally been important for the extraction of its sap, which is processed to balsam storax or Turkish sweetgum oil. The sap, which is collected by carefully stripping part of the bark, is used for medical purposes and for the production of perfume. For this reason, the forests used to be of major economical importance. However, there are fewer and fewer master oil makers who can pass on their trade.

Unfortunately, the liquidambar forest area has been reduced by illegal tree felling to create new or vaster agricultural fields. Representative sweetgum forests can still be found on the Yuvarlakçay near the village of Kavakarası, on the bank north of Sultaniye, northwest of Hamitköy, at Köyceğiz and at Tepearası.

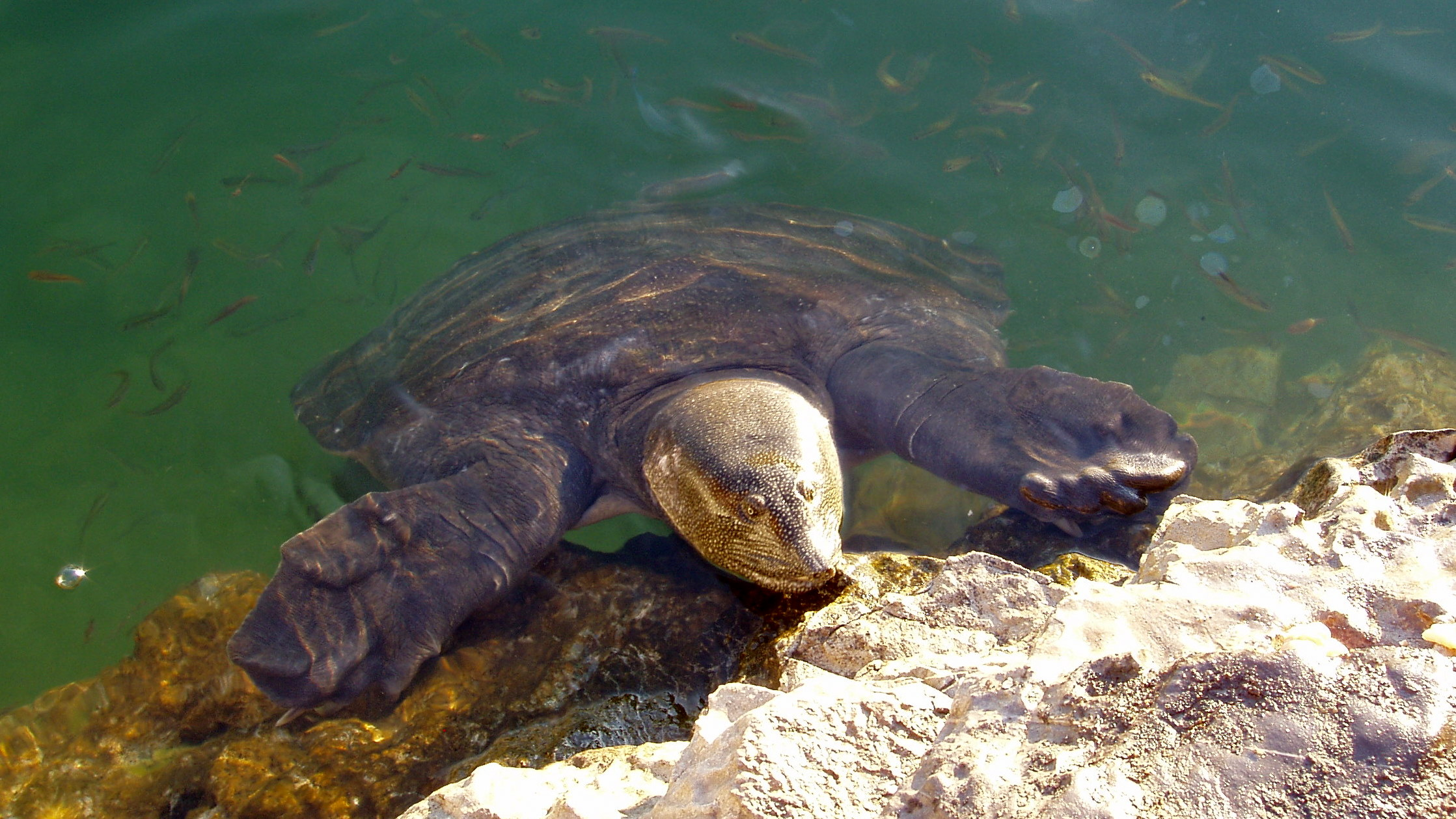
Nile turtle near mud bath on the Dalyan river. Photo: Maria Jonker

At the south side of Lake Köyceğiz there is a NW-SE fault, along which several sulphurous thermal springs are located.

The only spa resort, at Sultaniye, was restored in the 90’s and has been a popular tourist attraction ever since. The water temperature amounts to 40 °C. Apart from the thermal spring, it also has a mud bath. There is another mud bath somewhat downriver at a former river branch. This is a location where the Nile turtle (Trionyx triunguis) can be spotted. It is a turtle with a soft shell, thence also called African softshell turtle, which is about 1 metre in size. It is a protected, thermophile species. Consequently, it is often seen near the thermal springs along the fault line. The species occurs near to the sea, in lagoons, lakes, rivers and canals, both in fresh and brackish waters. The Nile turtle is mainly aquatic and will only leave the water for short periods to rest in the sun. In the Köyceğiz-Dalyan SEPA, oviposition takes place at the brackish waterside of İztuzu Beach. The Dalyan-Köyceğiz basin is in the utmost northwest of the species’ range.
Northeast and southeast of Köyceğiz Lake there are lowlands, whereas other parts are surrounded by hills. The highest among these are the Ölemez (937 m) in the southwest, and Bozburun Hill (556 m) in the south. The hills at the periphery of the area are mainly covered with Turkish pine trees (Pinus brutia).

The Turkish pine is endemic for the eastern Mediterranean and Turkey is the main part of its range. It usually grows at lower altitudes, from sea level to 600 metres height. The tree reaches a height of 20–35 metres, with a maximum trunk diameter of approx. 1 metre. On the river opposite Dalyan are the rock tombs of Caunos, the capital of ancient Caria. From the topmost rows of its amphitheatre and its Acropolis one has a wonderful view of the river, Alagöl (Çandır bay) and the reeds at the estuary. Apart from its cultural and historical significance, the historic city is interesting for its abundance of reptiles, birds and insects. Many of the altogether 33 reptile species of the Special Environmental Protected Area can be found at Caunos. Among its most conspicuous species are the hardim or starred agama, the European glass lizard, the common chameleon, and the black whip snake. Moreover, there are numerous tortoises and terrapins at the site. Spectacular birds at and around Caunos are the rock nuthatch, the common kestrel, the blue rock-thrush and the European roller.

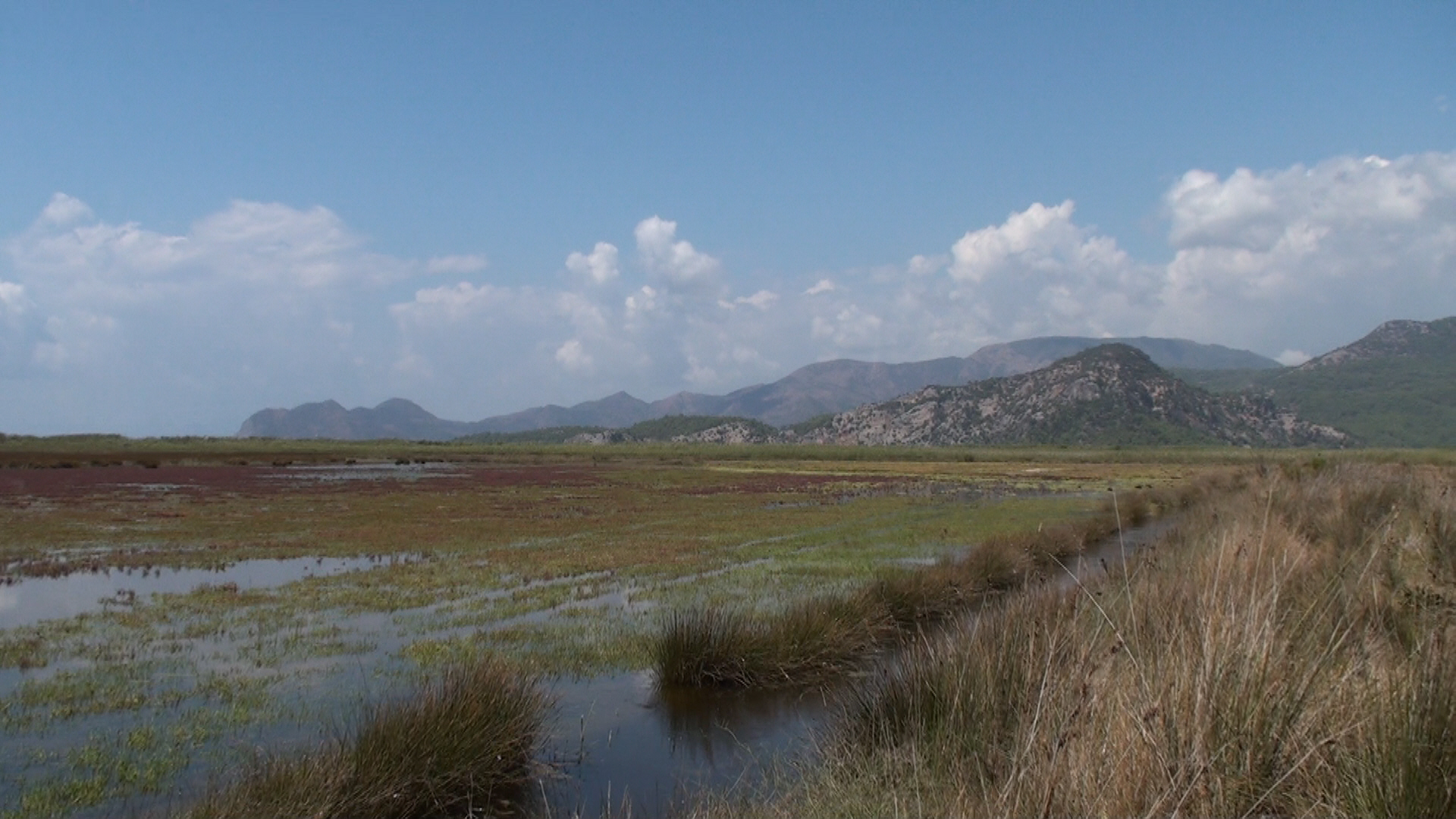
Wetlands bordering Sülüngür Lake. Photo: Maria Jonker

The Dalyan estuary is a labyrinth of canals through the reeds. During a boat trip through the reeds one can see all sorts of birds, such as kingfishers, the little egret, the great egret and the cormorant. At the west side of the delta is Alagöl, the bay of Çandır, which is heated by a number of thermal springs. This may be the reason why the bay is the mating scene for the loggerhead turtle in the second half of April.

Oviposition takes place at İztuzu Beach in May and June. With an average number of nests of approx. 200 per annum (57-330 range over the years of recording), İztuzu Beach is one of the main breeding areas of the species in the Mediterranean. For this reason there are strict regulations to counter any disturbance

- From 1 May till 1 October the beach is closed to the public between 20.00 and 08.00 o’clock, in order to rule out disorientation of adult turtles and hatchlings by human disturbance and artificial light.
- In the nesting zone, which is marked with stakes, parasols and sun beds are banned and digging is forbidden to prevent nest disturbance or damage.
- The presence of vehicles and pets is forbidden at the beach.
- Speed boats are forbidden, both on the river and within a zone of 1 mile from the coast.

Since May 2009 there has been a sea turtle centre at the beach, run by the Biology Department of Pamukkale University. The staff and volunteers patrol the beach and keep records during the breeding season. Injured turtles found at the beach or at the estuary are taken to the centre for treatment and rehabilitation.
The beach is also accessible by road. The route leads along the wetlands of Sülüngür Lake, which is shut off for boat traffic at the river side by a dalyan or fishing weir.
On Bozburun Tepesi above İztuzu Beach lies a radar station, which offers a wonderful panoramic vista of the Köyceğiz-Dalyan SEPA.
