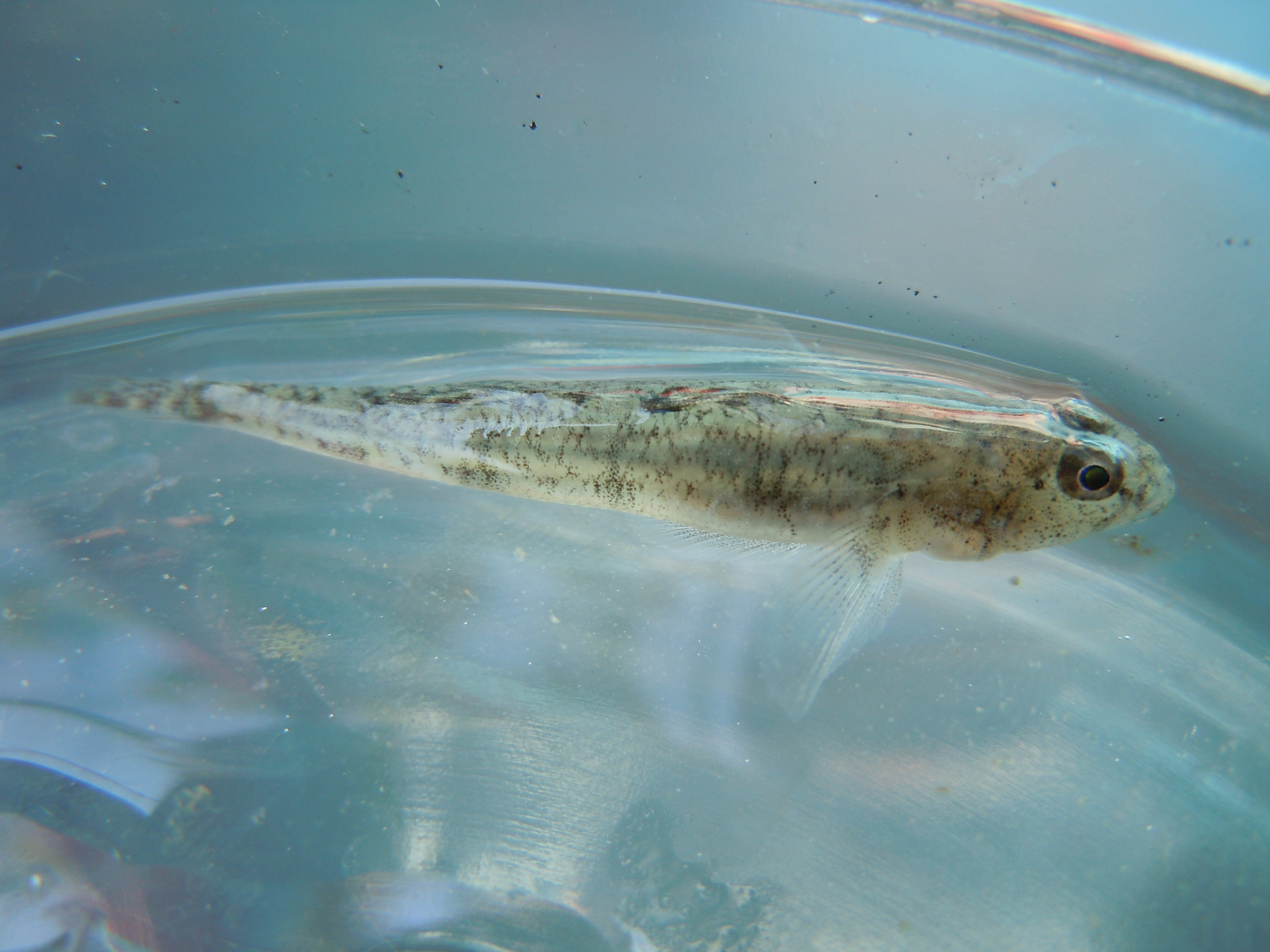
- Longtail dwarf goby (K. longecaudata), the type species of the genus

Scientific classification
- Kingdom: Animalia
- Phylum: Chordata
- Class: Actinopterygii
- Order: Gobiiformes
- Family: Oxudercidae
- Subfamily: Gobionellinae
- Genus: Knipowitschia; Iljin, 1927

Type species
- Gobius longecaudatus Kessler, 1877

Synonyms
- Bubyr Iljin, 1930

= Knipowitschia =

Knipowitschia Temporal range: Middle Miocene to present

Genus of fishes

Knipowitschia is a genus of marine, fresh and brackish water gobies native to Eurasia. The genus name almost certainly honours Nikolai Mikhailovich Knipovich (1862-1938), a biologist who led a number of expeditions to the Caspian Sea.

== Species ==
There are currently 12 recognized species in this genus:

- Knipowitschia byblisia Ahnelt, 2011 (Byblis goby)
- Knipowitschia caucasica (L. S. Berg, 1916) (Caucasian dwarf goby)
- Knipowitschia caunosi Ahnelt, 2011 (Caunos goby)
- Knipowitschia iljini L. S. Berg, 1931
- Knipowitschia longecaudata (Kessler, 1877) (Longtail dwarf goby)
- Knipowitschia mermere Ahnelt, 1995
- Knipowitschia milleri (Ahnelt & Bianco, 1990) (Acheron spring goby)
- Knipowitschia montenegrina Kovačić & Šanda, 2007
- Knipowitschia panizzae (Verga, 1841) (Adriatic dwarf goby)
- Knipowitschia radovici Kovačić, 2005 (Norin goby)
- Knipowitschia ricasolii (Di Caporiacco, 1935)
- Knipowitschia thessala (Vinciguerra, 1921) (Thessaly goby)

The fossil species †Knipowitschia bulgarica Schwarzhans, Bradić & Bratishko, 2016 is known from fossil otoliths from the Middle Miocene of Bulgaria.

Synonyms

- Knipowitschia cameliae Nalbant & Oţel, 1995; valid as K. caucasica (Danube delta dwarf goby)
- Knipowitschia croatica; valid as Orsinigobius croaticus (Neretva dwarf goby)
- Knipowitschia ephesi Ahnelt, 1995; valid as K. ricasolii
- Knipowitschia goerneri Ahnelt, 1991; valid as K. milleri (Corfu dwarf goby)
- Knipowitschia mrakovcici P. J. Miller, 2009; valid as K. panizzae
- Knipowitschia punctatissima; valid as Orsinigobius punctatissimus (Italian spring goby)
