= Knipowitschia byblisia =

Conservation status
- Least Concern (IUCN 3.1)

Scientific classification
- Kingdom: Animalia
- Phylum: Chordata
- Class: Actinopterygii
- Order: Gobiiformes
- Family: Oxudercidae
- Genus: Knipowitschia
- Species: K. byblisia

Binomial name
- Knipowitschia byblisia Anhelt, 2011

Species of fish

Knipowitschia byblisia, the Byblis goby, is a species of ray-finned fish from the family Gobiidae which is endemic to Lake Köycegiz in western Anatolia near the Aegean Sea. The lake is protected and the species is abundant within the lake so the IUCN have classified K. byblis as Least Concern. The specific name references the mythological figure Byblis, who was the twin sister of Caunos, the legendary founder of the ancient city Kaunos, the ruins of which are situated on the southwest Anatolian coast; near to Lake Köycegiz.
