= Celaenus =

Celaenus may refer to:

In Greek mythology (Κελαινός Kelainos):

- Celaenus, son of Poseidon and the Danaid Celaeno
- Celaenus, father of Tragasia who was a possible spouse of Miletus
- Celaenus, son of Phlyus and father of Caucon
- See Celaenus (mythology)

In biology:

- Hasora celaenus, a species in the genus Hasora
