= Areia =

Areia may refer to:

- Areia (trilobite)
- Areia, Paraíba, a city in Brazil
- Aria (satrapy), or Greek Areía, the Greek name form of a satrapy of the Achaemenid Empire in today's Afghanistan
- Athena Areia, as an epithet of the goddess Athena
- Aphrodite Areia, an epithet of the goddess Aphrodite
- Artemis Areia, as an epithet of the goddess Artemis
- Areia, in Greek mythology a daughter of Cleochus, by whom Apollo became the father of Miletus.
