= Knipowitschia caunosi =

Conservation status
- Least Concern (IUCN 3.1)

Scientific classification
- Kingdom: Animalia
- Phylum: Chordata
- Class: Actinopterygii
- Order: Gobiiformes
- Family: Oxudercidae
- Genus: Knipowitschia
- Species: K. caunosi

Binomial name
- Knipowitschia caunosi Anhelt, 2011

Species of fish

Knipowitschia caunosi, the Caunos goby or Köycegiz dwarf goby, is a species of ray-finned fish from the family Gobiidae which is endemic to Lake Köycegiz in western Anatolia near the Aegean Sea. The lake is protected and the species is abundant within the lake so the IUCN have classified K. caunosi as Least Concern. The specific name references the mythological figure Caunos, who was the twin sister of Byblis, in legend his sister fell in love with him and he fled to avoid committing incest, founding the ancient city Kaunos in Caria, the ruins of which are situated on the southwest Anatolian coast; near to Lake Köycegiz.
