= Dalaman =

- District and municipality
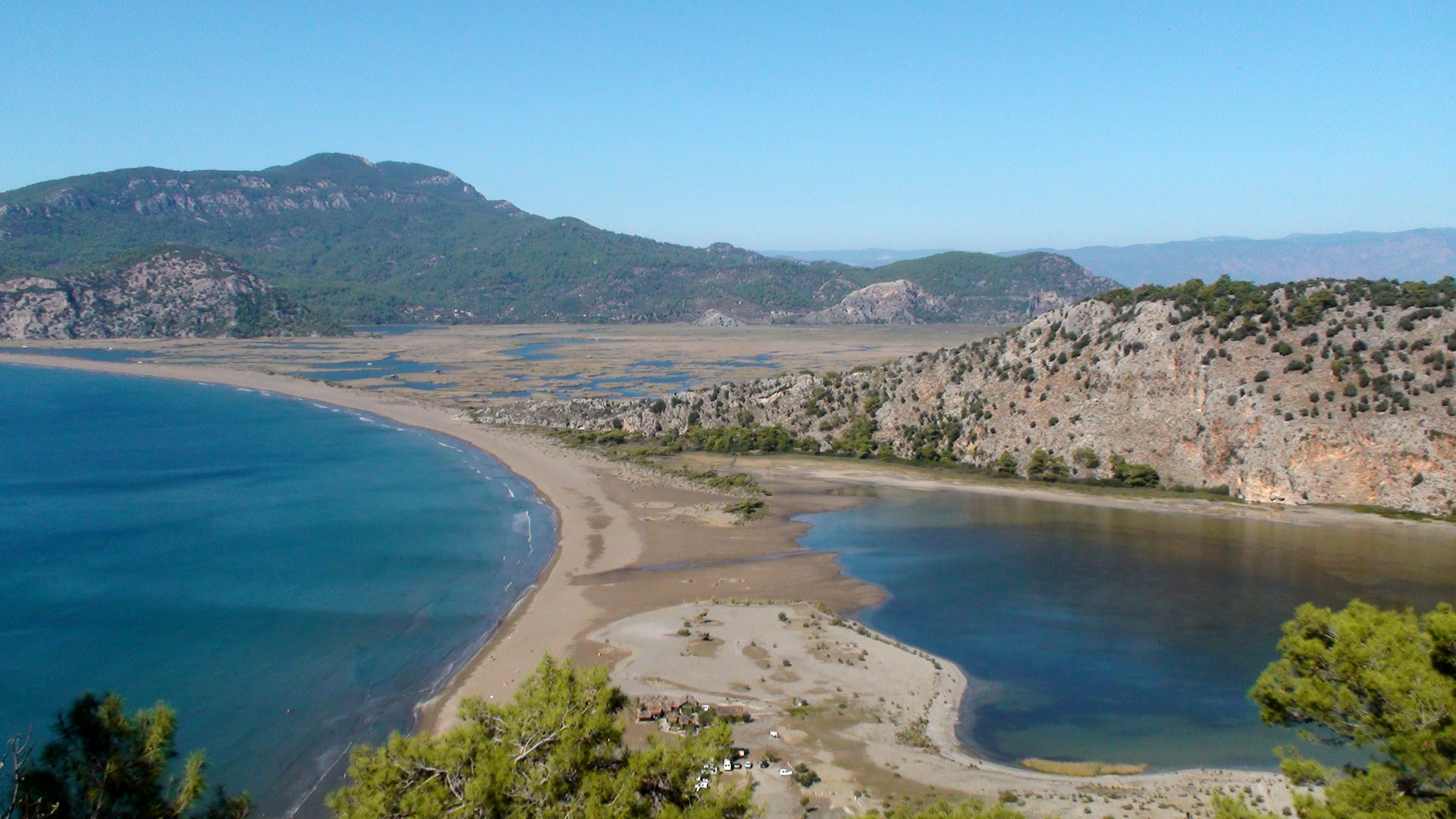
- Aerial view of İztuzu Beach

- Logo

- Map showing Dalaman District in Muğla Province

- Location within Turkey Location within Turkey Aegean
- Coordinates: 36°46′N 28°48′E
- Country: Turkey
- Province: Muğla

Government
  - Mayor: Sezer Durmuş (CHP)
- Area: 608 km^{2} (235 sq mi)
- Elevation: 15 m (49 ft)
- Population (2022): 47,482
  - Density: 78.1/km^{2} (202/sq mi)
- Time zone: UTC+3 (TRT)
- Postal code: 48770
- Area code: 0252
- Website: www.dalaman.bel.tr

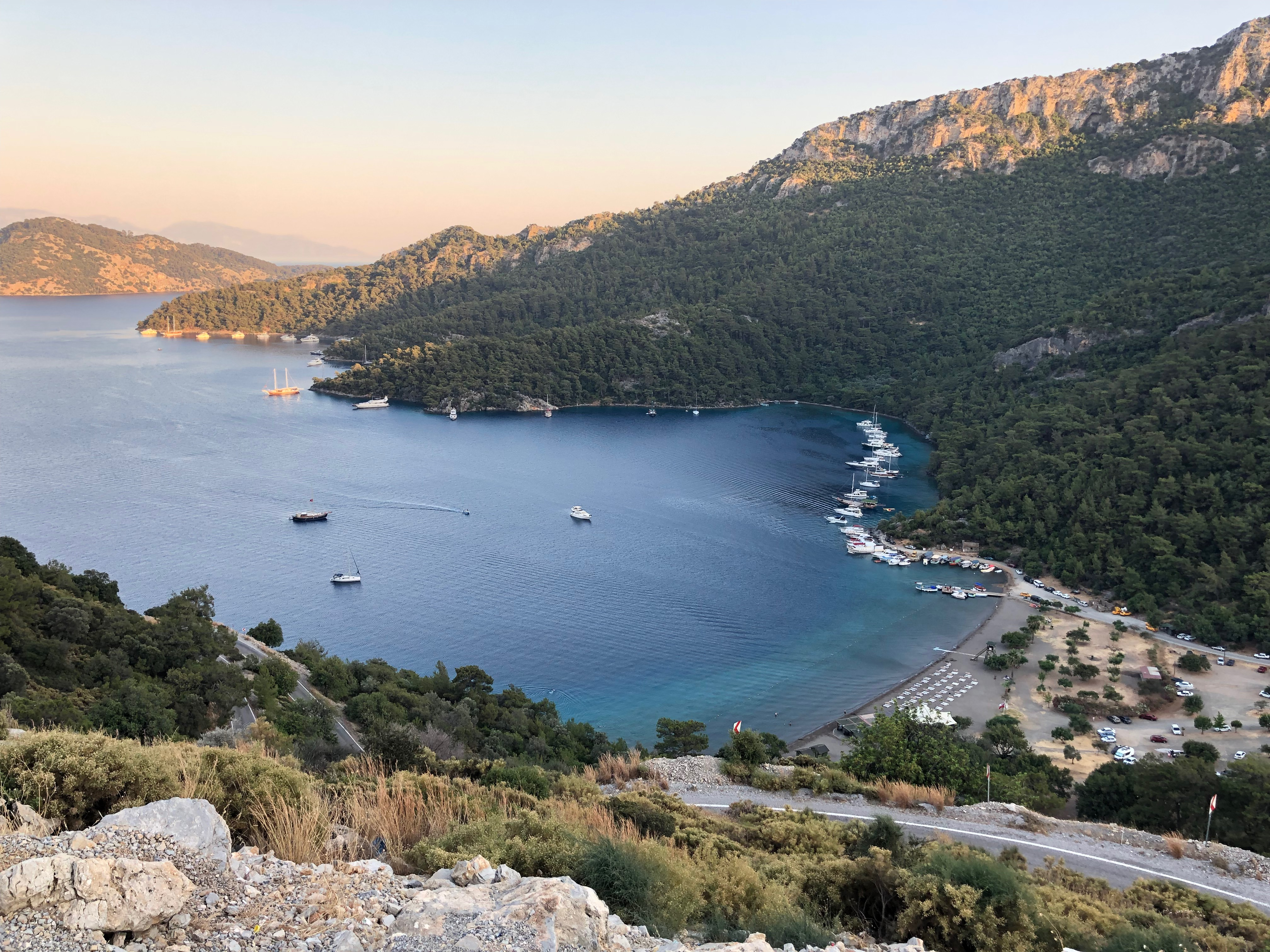
Sarsala Bay in Dalaman

Dalaman is a municipality and district of Muğla Province, Turkey. Its area is 608 km^{2}, and its population is 47,482 (2022). It is situated on the southwestern coast of Turkey.

Dalaman Stream (Dalaman çayı) forms much of the western border of the district, where its neighbors are Köyceğiz and Ortaca districts. The town of Dalaman is located in the coastal plain, whereas the rest of the district – towards Fethiye district on the coast and towards the high mountains on the northern border to Denizli Province – is upland, dominated by the valleys of the Dalaman Stream's eastern tributaries.

== Composition ==
There are 25 neighbourhoods in Dalaman District:

- Akçataş
- Altıntaş
- Atakent
- Bezkese
- Bozbel
- Çöğmen
- Darıyeri
- Ege
- Elcik
- Gürköy
- Gürlek
- Hürriyet
- Kapıkargın
- Karacaağaç
- Karaçalı
- Kargınkürü
- Kavacık
- Kayadibi
- Kızılkaya
- Merkez
- Narlı
- Sabunlu
- Şerefler
- Söğütlüyurt
- Taşbaşı

== Dalaman Airport ==
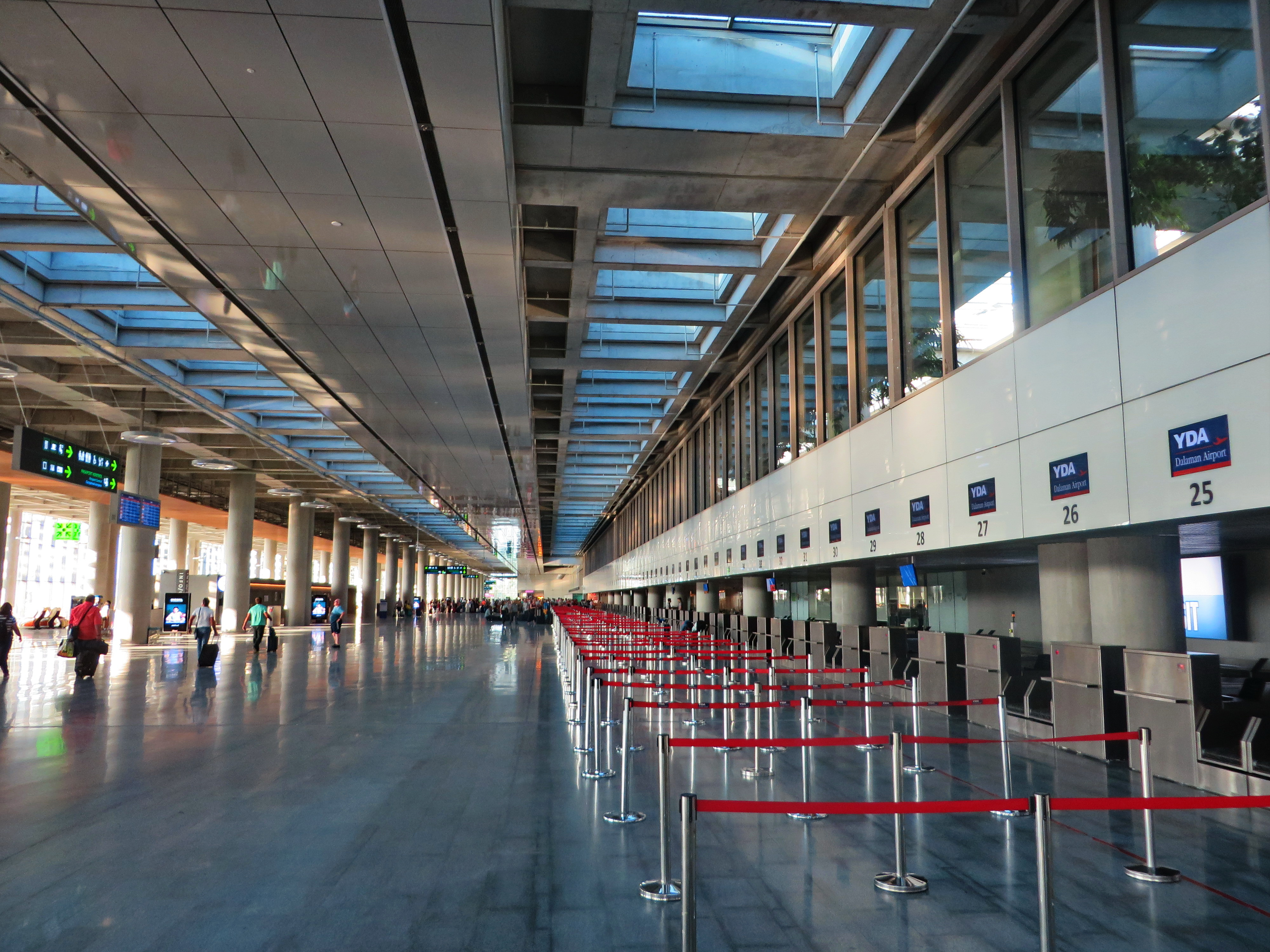
Dalaman Airport

Dalaman Airport serves as a gateway for the tourists who visit this part of Turkey, heading especially to seaside resorts to the west and east of Dalaman such as Marmaris, Fethiye, Köyceğiz, Dalyan, Ölüdeniz, Hisarönü and also Dalaman itself. Dalaman Airport (IATA: DLM, ICAO: LTBS) is small in comparison to other airports in Turkey, has parking spaces for 14 jet aircraft and is served by many operators. Turkish Airlines offer daily flights to Turkey's commercial and financial capital Istanbul. The Airport serves as a seasonal base for other airlines notably Pegasus Airlines and Free Bird Airlines. A new international airport terminal has opened in July 2018

== Climate ==
Dalaman has a hot Mediterranean climate. Summers are long and dry whilst winters are short and cool. Dalaman is a very sunny place throughout the whole of the year especially in June and July. Dalaman holds the record for one of the highest recorded air temperatures in Turkey.

Climate data for Dalaman
Month	Jan	Feb	Mar	Apr	May	Jun	Jul	Aug	Sep	Oct	Nov	Dec	Year
Record high °C (°F)	25.3 (77.5)	25.0 (77.0)	31.0 (87.8)	34.0 (93.2)	38.0 (100.4)	43.5 (110.3)	48.5 (119.3)	43.1 (109.6)	42.0 (107.6)	39.0 (102.2)	32.8 (91.0)	25.0 (77.0)	48.5 (119.3)
Mean daily maximum °C (°F)	15.8 (60.4)	16.1 (61.0)	18.5 (65.3)	21.8 (71.2)	26.3 (79.3)	31.5 (88.7)	33.9 (93.0)	33.9 (93.0)	31.1 (88.0)	26.7 (80.1)	21.3 (70.3)	17.0 (62.6)	24.5 (76.1)
Mean daily minimum °C (°F)	5.6 (42.1)	5.8 (42.4)	7.0 (44.6)	9.6 (49.3)	13.5 (56.3)	17.8 (64.0)	20.7 (69.3)	20.6 (69.1)	17.2 (63.0)	13.3 (55.9)	9.4 (48.9)	6.9 (44.4)	12.3 (54.1)
Record low °C (°F)	−4.0 (24.8)	−5.3 (22.5)	−1.3 (29.7)	0.0 (32.0)	6.1 (43.0)	9.7 (49.5)	13.0 (55.4)	14.0 (57.2)	7.8 (46.0)	4.2 (39.6)	−1.5 (29.3)	−1.3 (29.7)	−5.3 (22.5)
Average precipitation mm (inches)	191.2 (7.53)	147.5 (5.81)	91.0 (3.58)	51.6 (2.03)	25.1 (0.99)	8.0 (0.31)	2.8 (0.11)	1.9 (0.07)	20.4 (0.80)	70.7 (2.78)	159.6 (6.28)	211.4 (8.32)	981.2 (38.61)
Average rainy days	12.2	10.8	9.0	7.4	4.3	2.2	1.4	1.5	2.1	5.0	8.8	12.1	76.8
Average relative humidity (%)	64	63	64	66	66	57	57	59	56	61	66	67	62
Mean monthly sunshine hours	158.1	156.8	213.9	237	300.7	342	365.8	347.2	300	244.9	183	151.9	3,001.3
Source 1: Devlet Meteoroloji İşleri Genel Müdürlüğü
Source 2: Weather2

== Education ==
There are five kindergartens, 13 primary schools, ten secondary schools, five high schools, one public education center, and one vocational training center affiliated with the Ministry of National Education in the district.
