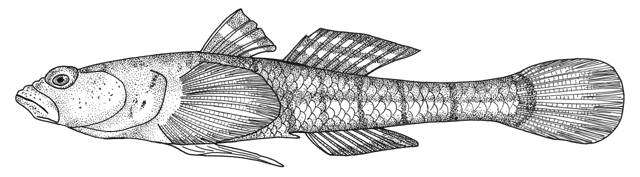

Scientific classification
- Kingdom: Animalia
- Phylum: Chordata
- Class: Actinopterygii
- Order: Gobiiformes
- Family: Oxudercidae
- Genus: Knipowitschia
- Species: K. iljini

Binomial name
- Knipowitschia iljini L. S. Berg, 1931

= Knipowitschia iljini =

Species of fish

Knipowitschia iljini is a species of goby Endemic to the Caspian Sea, where it inhabits the deep waters in the central part. This species can reach a length of 4.7 centimetres (1.9 in) TL. The specific name honours the taxonomist of Gobiiformes Boris Sergeevich Iljin (1889-1958), who researched the gobies of the Black and Caspian seas.
