= Döğüşbelen =

Dögüşbelen
- Neighbourhood
- Location in Turkey Dögüşbelen (Turkey Aegean)
- Coordinates: 36°59′N 28°36′E
- Country: Turkey
- Province: Muğla
- District: Köyceğiz
- Elevation: 22 m (72 ft)
- Population (2022): 1,508
- Time zone: UTC+3 (TRT)
- Postal code: 48800
- Area code: 0252

Döğüşbelen is a neighbourhood of the municipality and district of Köyceğiz, Muğla Province, Turkey. Its population is 1,508 (2022).

== Geography ==
Döğüşbelen is at the west of Köyceğiz Lake and considered as the boundary between the geographic regions Mediterranean and Aegean of Turkey. Distance to Köyceğiz is 10 kilometres (6.2 mi) and to Muğla is 40 kilometres (25 mi).

== History ==
The village was founded in the first half of the 19th century. The early settlers were Abkhazians who fled from the advance of Russian Empire. In 1863, the nomadic Turkmens so called Yörük also tried to settle around the village. But the Ottoman government forces subdued them. The name of the village Döğüşbelen (fight-pass) refers to this struggle. However, after the 1930s, i.e., during the Turkish Republic era Yörüks peacefully settled in Döğüşbelen.

== Living ==
The average age of the population in Döğüşbelen is higher than the other villages around, for a considerable portion of the population is composed of retired people. Although the village is an agricultural village, lately tourism has also begun to play a role in village economy.
