= Acheron spring goby =

Conservation status
- Critically Endangered (IUCN 3.1)

Scientific classification
- Kingdom: Animalia
- Phylum: Chordata
- Class: Actinopterygii
- Order: Gobiiformes
- Family: Gobiidae
- Genus: Knipowitschia
- Species: K. milleri

Binomial name
- Knipowitschia milleri (Ahnelt & Bianco, 1990)

Synonyms
- Orsinigobius milleri Ahnelt & Bianco, 1990

Species of fish

Knipowitschia milleri, the Acheron Spring goby, is a species of goby endemic to the Acheron River delta in Greece.

== Taxonomy ==
The genus is named in honor of the Russian ichthyologist Nikolai Mikhailovich Knipovich, while the species is named after the British ichthyologist Peter James Miller. The Acheron spring goby was previously placed in the genus Padogobius.

The Acheron spring goby is very closely related to the Corfu dwarf goby and some authors have suggested that the two species should be lumped. However, studies of morphology and genetic data currently support the distinctness of these two species. However, the ranges of the two species are not well-defined where they meet, and a population of gobies that occurs on the island of Zakynthos in the Ionian Sea may belong to either of the species.

== Description ==
The Acheron spring goby is a small fish. The largest recorded specimen was a male with a standard length of 2.6 centimetres (1.0 in).

== Distribution and ecology ==
The goby is restricted to the Acheron River delta in Greece. It is mainly found in stagnant or slow-moving freshwater habitats in the lowlands. The water bodies it prefers have abundant vegetation, temperate conditions, and muddy or sandy beds. It also inhabits somewhat brackish habitats like coastal lagoons and salt marshes. Juvenile gobies are free-swimming, while adults are benthic.

The Acheron spring goby's reproductive biology has not been studied, but is thought to be similar to other species in its genus. In other Knipowitschia gobies, males build a nest inside a cavity and protect their eggs until they hatch. The breeding season lasts from spring to summer (February to March). Like other congeneric gobies, Acheron spring gobies have short life cycles, living for 12–18 months, with the oldest recorded individual being two years old. The species feeds on small crustaceans and other invertebrates inhabiting the benthic zone like chironomid larvae.

== Conservation ==
The species is listed as being critically endangered on the IUCN Red List. It has an extremely small range, with a total area of around 32 km^{2}, and is threatened by habitat loss caused by land reclamation and draining in Acheron River delta. Other threats include pollution caused by agricultural contaminants and sewage and competition with invasive fish.
