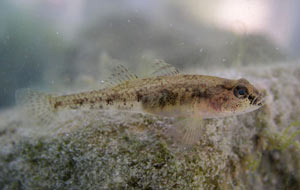

Conservation status
- Least Concern (IUCN 3.1)

Scientific classification
- Kingdom: Animalia
- Phylum: Chordata
- Class: Actinopterygii
- Division: Teleostei
- Order: Gobiiformes
- Family: Oxudercidae
- Genus: Knipowitschia
- Species: K. panizzae

Binomial name
- Knipowitschia panizzae (Verga, 1841)

Synonyms
- ? panizzai Verga, 1841; Gobius panizzae Verga, 1841; Knipowitschia panizzai (Verga, 1841); Padogobius panizzai (Verga, 1841); Pomatoschistus panizzai (Verga, 1841)

= Adriatic dwarf goby =

Species of fish

The Adriatic dwarf goby (Knipowitschia panizzae) is a species of freshwater and brackish water ray-finned fish belonging to the family Oxudercidae, which includes the mudskippers and related species of goby. This species is found around the Adriatic Sea in southern Europe.

== Taxonomy ==
The Adriatic dwarf goby was first formally described as Gobius panizzae in 1841 by D .Verga with its type locality given as the Lagoon of Comacchio. In 1927 Boris Sergeevich Iljin proposed the genus Knipowitschia with Gobius longecaudatus, a species described by Karl Kessler in 1877, as its type species. The Adriatic dwarf goby is now classified in the genus Knipowitschia within the subfamily Gobionellinae within the family Oxudercidae.

== Etymology ==
The Adriatic dwarf goby belongs to the genus Knipowitschia which Iljin did not explain but it is almost certainly an eponym honouring the Russian oceanographer and zoologist Nikolai Mikhailovich Knipowitsch, who led several expeditions to the Caspian Sea. The specific name is also an eponym, with the person honoured again not identified, however, it is probably the Italian anatomist Bartolomeo Panizza.

== Description ==
The Adriatic dwarf goby has a maximum total length of 7 cm (2.8 in). This species has two dorsal fins, the second dorsal fin having 8 branched rays, and its pelvic fins are unified. It has between 32 and 39 scales along the lateral line.

== Distribution and habitat ==
The Adriatic dwarf goby is found around the Adriatic Sea from southern Italy to Montenegro. It has been introduced to the western side of the Italian Peninsula. This is a species of shallow, well vegetated habitats in streams, lakes, estuaries, lagoons, lower reaches of rivers and springs.

== Biology ==
The Adriatic dwarf goby feeds on invertebrates. They are a short-lived fish which lives for two years or less, they spawn after their first winter from April to August. The females lay eggs every 10 to 15 days during this time, laying their eggs under bivalve shells, stones or plant matter and the males guard the eggs, cleaning the shelters and hiding them in the substrate. The juveniles are pelagic.
