= Passanda =

Town of ancient Caria

Coordinates: 36°46′52″N 28°41′34″E

Passanda (Ancient Greek: Πάσσανδα) or Pasanda (Πάσανδα) was a town of ancient Caria. It was a member of the Delian League since it appears in tribute records of Athens between the years 450/49 and 421/0 BCE, paying a phoros of 3000 drachmae. For at least part of the Hellenistic period, it belonged to the territory of Kaunos. Passanda is also mentioned by Stephanus of Byzantium and by the Stadiasmus. The latter places it at a distance of thirty stadia from Kaunos.

Its site is located near Gökbel, in Ortaca district, Muğla Province, Turkey.
