= Pronoe =

Pronoe (/ˈprɒnoʊiː/; Ancient Greek: Προνόη Pronóē means 'forethought') refers to six characters in Greek mythology.

- Pronoe, one of the 50 Nereids, marine-nymph daughters of the 'Old Man of the Sea' Nereus and the Oceanid Doris. Her name means "the provident" or "bewailing, complaining".
- Pronoe, daughter of Phorbus. She married King Aetolus of Aetolia and bore him Pleuron and Calydon.
- Pronoe, an Argive princess as daughter of King Melampus of Argos, and Iphianeira, daughter of Megapenthes. She was considered to be a seer.
- Pronoe, daughter of the river god Asopus, mother of Phocus by Poseidon.
- Pronoe, a Naiad of a river in Lycia. She told Caunus what had happened to his sister Byblis (that she had killed herself), and persuaded him to stay with her on condition that he receive rulership of the country of Lycia or Caria. The couple had a son Aegialus who inherited the kingdom upon his father's death.
- Pronoe, a nymph mother of the Trojan Lassus. This son was killed by Podalirius during the Trojan War.
