= Dalaman River =

River in Turkey

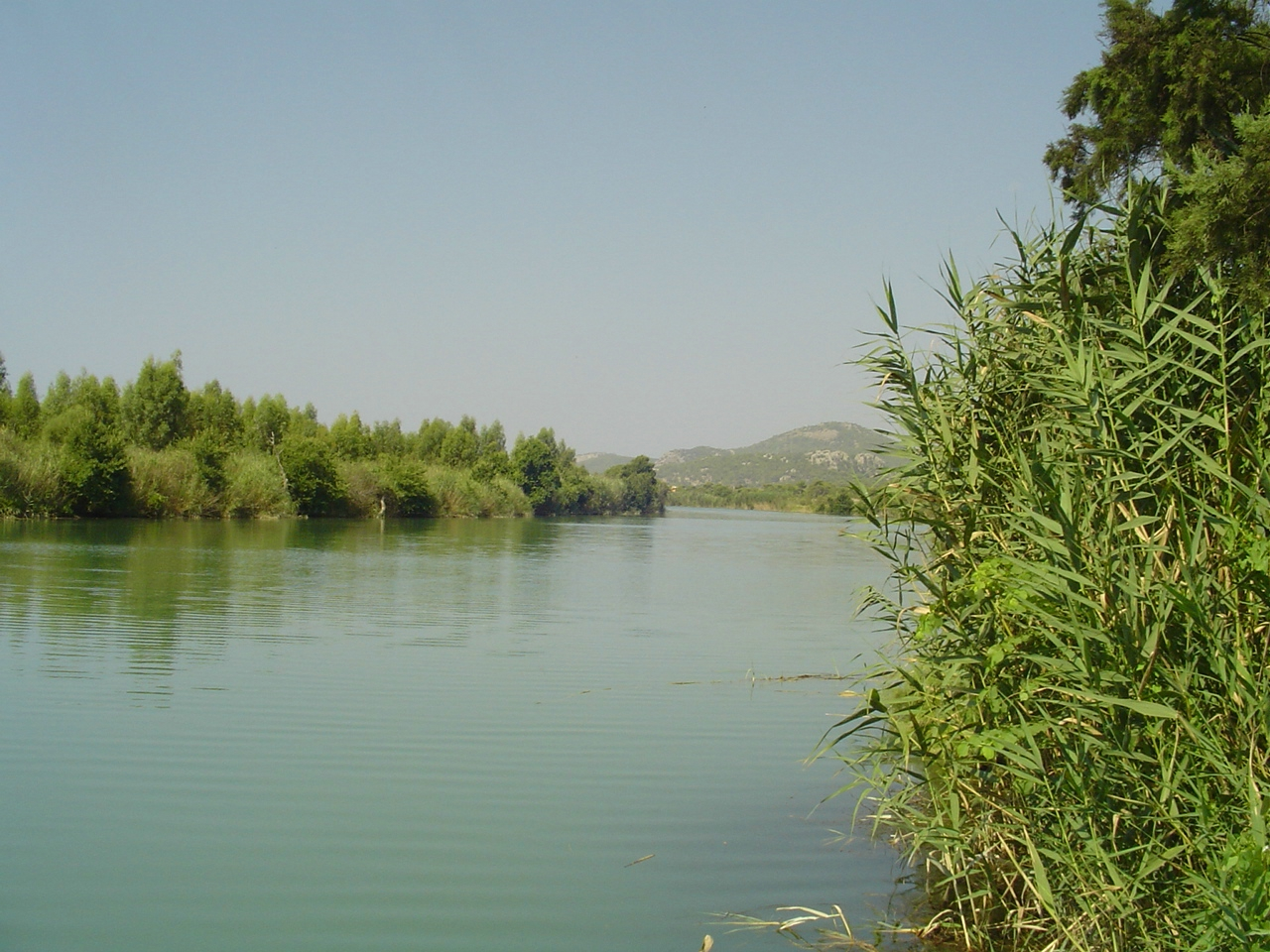

Location
- Country: Turkey

Physical characteristics
- Mouth
  - coordinates: 36.706370°N 28.726726°E

The Dalaman River (Dalaman çayı) or "Dalaman Stream" is a river in the Mediterranean Region of Turkey, emptying into the Mediterranean Sea on the southwestern coast of Turkey, in the Muğla Province. The river forms much of the western border of the Dalaman district, where its neighbors are Köyceğiz and Ortaca districts.

The stream, 229 km (142 mi) long, enters the Mediterranean to the west of modern-day Dalaman. Upstream it is dammed in four places, after an origin in the vicinity of Sarikavak in Denizli Province.

It was known as the River Indus (Ινδός) in classical antiquity, not be confused with the south Asian Indus, which was also known in antiquity. The Indus was the border between Caria and Lycia.

Besides the two dams built for electricity and irrigation, the river is also used for recreational purposes. Multiple trekking trails exist throughout the length of the river, and rafting is done year round.
