= Euxine (Caria) =

Town of ancient Caria

Coordinates: 36°50′14″N 28°42′57″E

Euxine (Ancient Greek: Εὔξεινη) was a town of ancient Caria.

Its site is located near Kepez, Ortaca, Asian Turkey.
