= Knipowitschia montenegrina =

Conservation status
- Data Deficient (IUCN 3.1)

Scientific classification
- Kingdom: Animalia
- Phylum: Chordata
- Class: Actinopterygii
- Order: Gobiiformes
- Family: Oxudercidae
- Genus: Knipowitschia
- Species: K. montenegrina

Binomial name
- Knipowitschia montenegrina Kovačić & Šanda, 2007

Species of fish

Knipowitschia montenegrina, the Montenegro Dwarf Goby, is a species of freshwater goby Endemic to the Morača River in Montenegro where it prefers shallows and small pools with algae covered gravel substrates. This species can reach a length of 2.8 centimetres (1.1 in) SL.
