= Sultaniye, Köyceğiz =

Sultaniye
- Neighbourhood
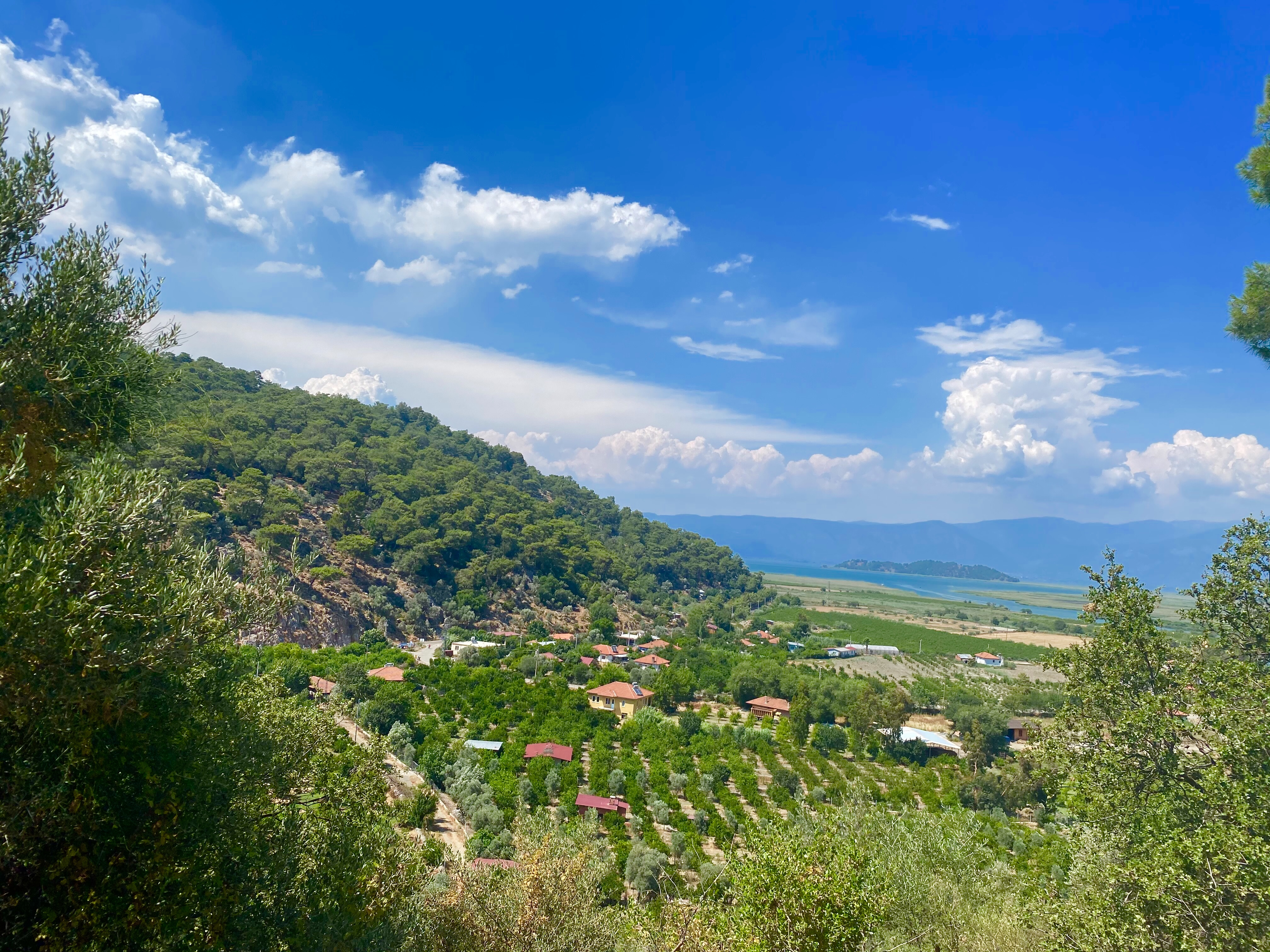

- Location within Turkey Location within Turkey Aegean
- Coordinates: 36°52′52″N 28°34′53″E
- Country: Turkey
- Province: Muğla
- District: Köyceğiz
- Population (2022): 265
- Time zone: UTC+3 (TRT)

Sultaniye is a neighbourhood of the municipality and district of Köyceğiz, Muğla Province, Turkey. Its population is 265 (2022). It is on Lake Köyceğiz, and popular among spa bathers and tourists. Its bath ruin was restored in the 1990s, to be turned into a major tourist attraction.

== History ==
Archeological finds both at Kaunos and Sultaniye indicate that there must have been a sanctuary dedicated to the goddess Leto near the present Sultaniye Spa.
Nearby the thermal spring area ruins have been found dating back as far as the Roman era, which show that there must have been a sort of spa and treatment facility ever since the first settlements in the area.

== Hot springs ==
The Sultaniye hot springs are located on a fault line at the southwest bank of the lake, on the slope of Ölemez Mountain.
Sulfurous water of 40°C seeps out of a crack next to the spa’s domed thermal bath, spreading the nasty smell of rotten eggs over the complex. The mildly radioactive water is rich in Radon content and furthermore contains sulfur, iron, calcium, potassium, and other minerals.
It is recommended for -amongst others- skin complaints, arthritis, muscle fatigue and rheumatism. Sultaniye Spa also has mud baths which are said to rejuvenate the skin.
