= Miletus (mythology) =

Mythical founder of Miletus in Greek mythology

Miletus (Ancient Greek: Μίλητος) was a character from Greek mythology, the eponymous mythical founder of the city of Miletus.

== Family ==
Miletus was son of Apollo and Areia, nymph-daughter of Cleochus, of Crete. His mother in other accounts was Acacallis, a daughter of Minos who consorted with Apollo. Yet another source calls Miletus' mother Deïone, and himself by the matronymic Deionides. Finally, one source gives Miletus as the son of Euxantius, himself son of Minos by a Telchinian woman Dexithea.

Miletus married either Eidothea, daughter of King Eurytus of Caria, or Tragasia, daughter of Celaenus, or Cyane, daughter of the river god Maeander, or Areia, and by her had a son Kaunos and a daughter Byblis.

A different family of Miletus was given by Nonnus, his father was Asterius, son of Minos and Androgenia while Caunus and Byblis became his siblings instead of his children.

Comparative table of Miletus' family
Relation	Names	Sources					
Relation	Names	Sch. on Apollon.	Parthenius	Ovid	Apollodorus	Antoninus	Nonnus
Parents	Euxantius	✓					
Parents	Apollo and Deione			✓			
Parents	Apollo and Areia				✓		
Parents	Apollo and Acacallis					✓	
Parents	Asterius						✓
Consorts	Tragasia		✓				
Consorts	Cyane			✓			
Consorts	Eidothea					✓	
Siblings	Caunus						✓
Siblings	Byblis						✓
Children	Caunus		✓	✓		✓	
Children	Byblis		✓	✓		✓	

== Mythology ==
When Areia gave birth to her son she hid him in a bed of Smilax; Cleochus found the child there and named him Miletus after the plant. In the tradition in which his mother was Acacallis, the daughter of Minos, fearing her father's wrath, exposed the child, but Apollo commanded the she-wolves to come down and nurse the child.

He was loved by both Minos and Sarpedon, but showed preference for the latter, and this became the reason why Sarpedon was expelled from Crete by his brother. Following the advice of Sarpedon, Miletus with an army also left Crete for Samos, then moved to Caria and became the mythical founder and eponym of the city of Miletus. Myths further relate that the hero Miletus founded the city only after slaying Asterius, son of Anax; and that the region known as Miletus was originally called 'Anactoria'.
