= Ulucami, Köyceğiz =

Village in Turkey

Ulucami
- Neighbourhood
- Location in Turkey Ulucami (Turkey Aegean)
- Coordinates: 36°57′45″N 28°40′48″E
- Country: Turkey
- Province: Muğla
- District: Köyceğiz
- Population (2024): 2,491
- Time zone: UTC+3 (TRT)

Ulucami is a neighbourhood in the municipality and district of Köyceğiz, Muğla Province, Turkey. Its population is 2,491 (2024).
