= Korission Lagoon =

Lagoon in Corfu, Greece

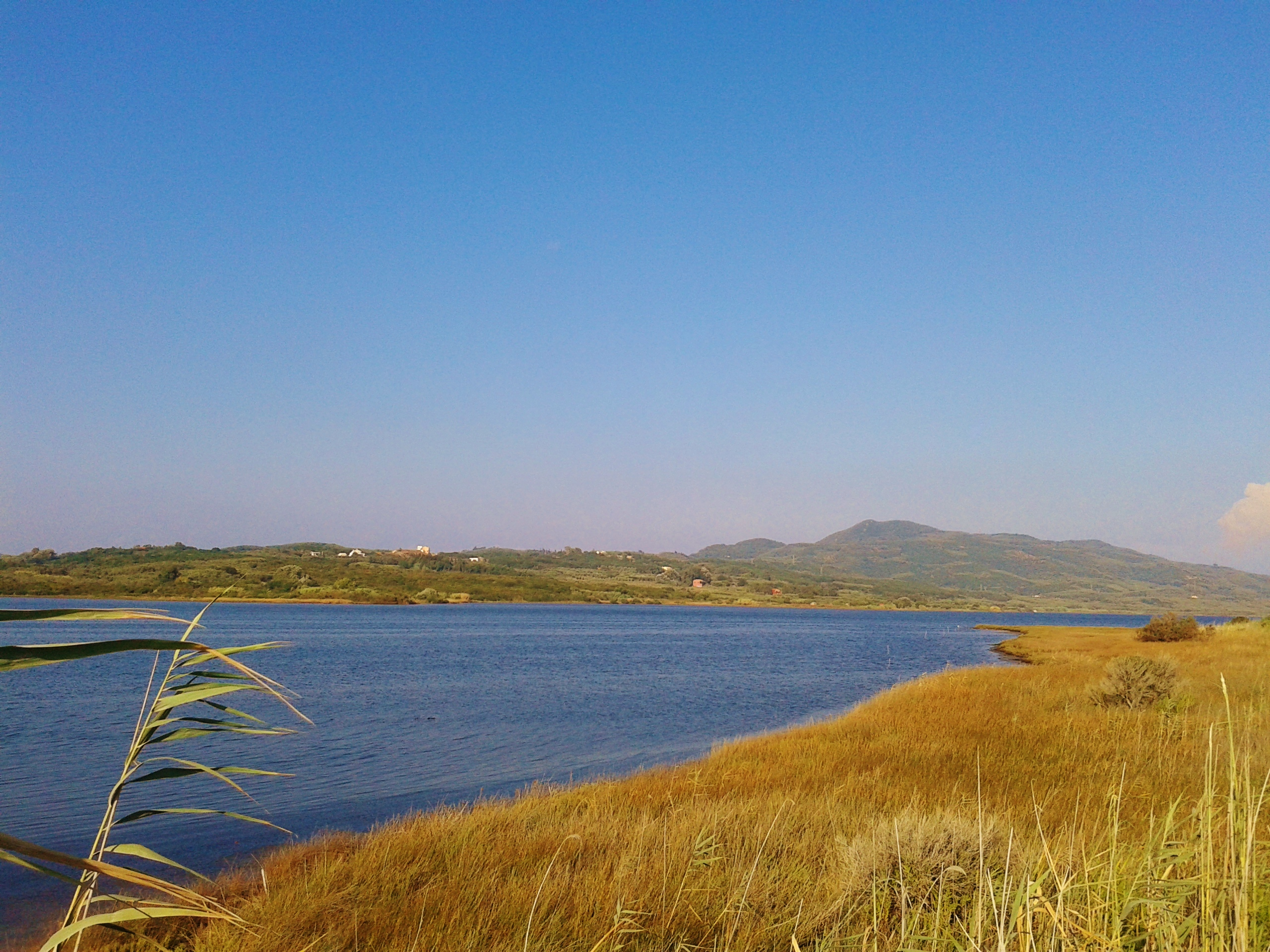
- Lake Korission

- Location within Corfu
- Location: Corfu, Ionian Islands, Greece
- Coordinates: 39°26′46″N 19°54′25″E

Korission Lagoon is a coastal lagoon located in the southern part of the Greek island of Corfu, in the Ionian Sea. It is located near the village of Agios Mattheos and is separated from the sea by Chalikouna Beach. It has a surface area of 427 ha (approx. 1 050 acres) and it drains into the sea through a channel which bisects Chalikouna Beach. The lagoon was created by the sand dunes that cut the lake's basin off from the sea between 140,000 and 250,000 years ago.

Korission Lagoon and its environs are protected by the Natura 2000 treaty, the protected area includes the nearby coastal areas, an unusual forest of prickly juniper Juniperus phoenicea, which is known as cedar, in addition to many sand dunes which reach heights in excess of 15 metres (49 ft). There are also small reed beds and groves of tamarisk, white water lilies (Nymphaea alba) and 14 different species of orchid in the dunes. The lagoon has had over 126 species of birds recorded, including among others great cormorants, Eurasian wigeons, great egrets and greater flamingo. There are also many species of butterfly, as well as the Jersey tiger moth (Euplagia quadripunctaria). The Corfu dwarf goby is endemic to the lagoon and its surrounding springs. Other fish species found in the waters of the lagoon include the Mediterranean killifish (Aphanius fasciatus) and the Epiros minnow (Pelasgus thesproticus). Reptiles present in the area include the chelonians Hermann's tortoise (Testudo hermanni), the European pond turtle (Emys orbicularis) and the Balkan pond turtle (Mauremys rivulata), while among the snake species recorded are the javelin sand boa (Eryx jaculus) and the four-lined snake (Elaphe quatuorlineata). The mammals present include greater horseshoe bats (Rhinolophus ferrumequinum), long-fingered bats (Myotis capaccinii) and, possibly, European otters (Lutra lutra).

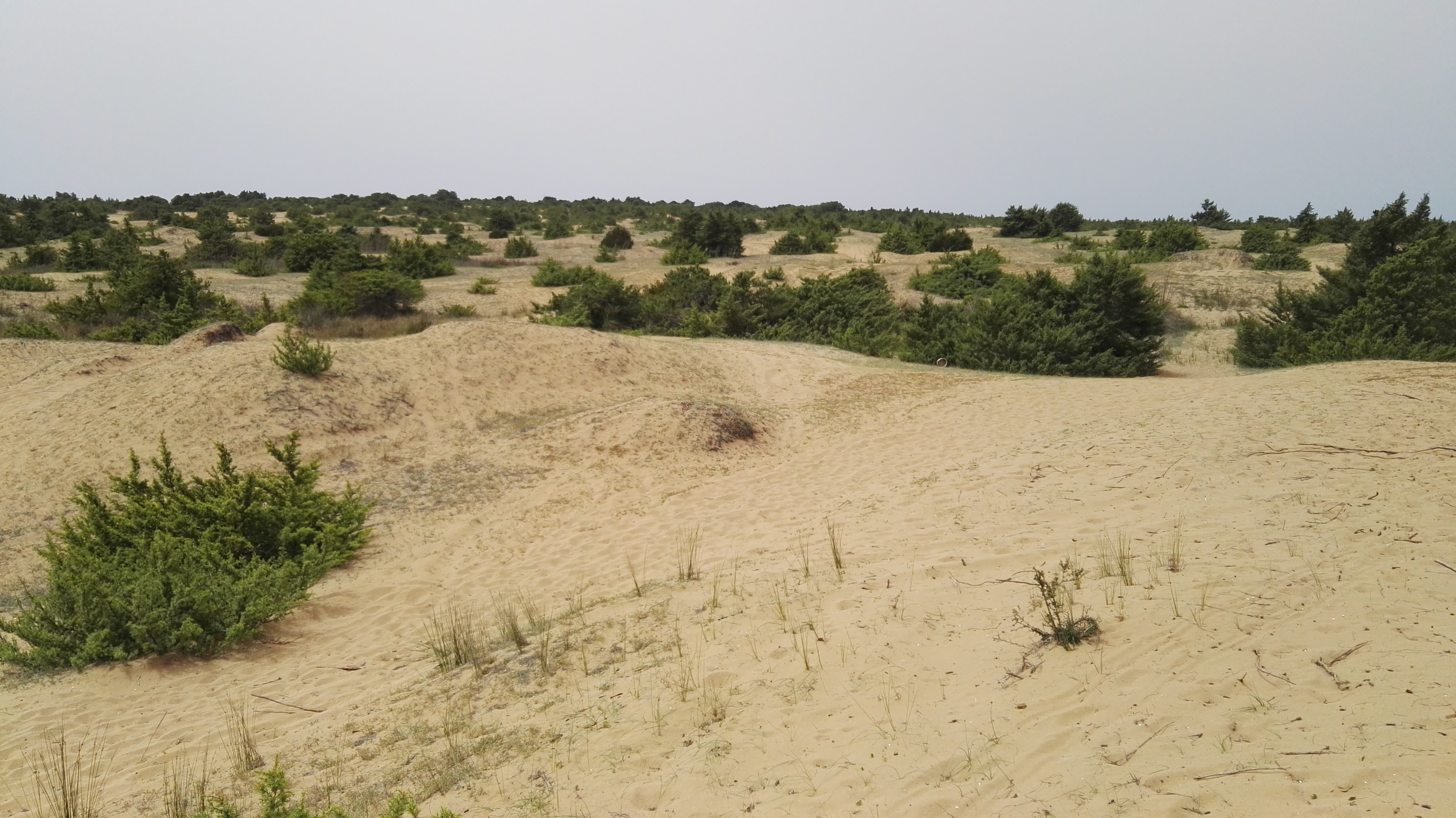
The dunes

Korission Lagoon and the land around it have been subjected to archaeological excavations. Early finds included part of the lower jaw of a hippopotamus, among smaller bones, and a worked stone from the Paleolithic. The stone confirmed human presence around the waterbody in the Paleolithic. Subsequent excavations discovered more bones and artifacts.
