= Knipowitschia mrakovcici =

Conservation status
- Critically Endangered (IUCN 3.1)

Scientific classification
- Kingdom: Animalia
- Phylum: Chordata
- Class: Actinopterygii
- Order: Gobiiformes
- Family: Oxudercidae
- Genus: Knipowitschia
- Species: K. mrakovcici

Binomial name
- Knipowitschia mrakovcici P. J. Miller, 2009

Synonyms
- Knipowitschia mrakovcici Mrakovčić, Mišetić & Povž, 1995 (nomen nudum)

Species of fish

Knipowitschia mrakovcici is a species of freshwater goby Endemic to the Krka River catchment in Croatia where it is only found in lakes. Males of this species can reach a length of 3.2 centimetres (1.3 in) SL while females only reach 2.8 centimetres (1.1 in) SL. The specific name honours the Croatian biologist Milorad Mrakovčić of the University of Zagreb, who provided the author, Peter J. Miller, with the original type material.
