= Cleochus =

Greek biography of Cleochus

In Greek mythology, Cleochus (Ancient Greek: Κλέοχος) was the name shared by two individuals:

- Cleochus, the Cretan father of the nymph Aria, mother of Miletus by Apollo. When Areia gave birth to her son she hid him in a bed of smilax, Cleochus found the child there and named him Miletus after the plant. Clement of Alexandria quotes Leandrios saying that Cleochus was buried within the temple enclosure of Didyma in Miletus.
- Cleochos, one of the followers of Dionysus in the Indian War against the Indian king Deriades.
