= Euxantius =

Mythical king of Ceos

In Greek mythology, Euxantius /juːɡˈzænʃəs/ (Ancient Greek: Εὐξάντιος) or Euxanthius /juːɡˈzænθiəs/ (Εὐξάνθιος) was the son of Minos and a Telchinian woman Dexithea (or Dexione). His mother was spared by the gods as they exterminated the Telchines and remained at Ceos where, according to Bacchylides, Minos arrived at one point and, having consorted with Dexithea, left her half his army who set up a colony; in due time Dexithea gave birth to Euxantius who eventually became king of the island. Pindar informs that later on, Euxantius refused to share the power over the Cretan kingdom with Minos' six other sons, being bound to his own domain.

One source has Euxantius as father of Miletus (otherwise son of Apollo and a Cretan maiden). In yet another account a clan Euxanti(a)dae is said to have descended from Euxantius.
