= Gülpınar, Köyceğiz =

Village in Turkey

Gülpınar
- Neighbourhood
- Location in Turkey Gülpınar (Turkey Aegean)
- Coordinates: 36°57′31″N 28°41′36″E
- Country: Turkey
- Province: Muğla
- District: Köyceğiz
- Population (2024): 3,313
- Time zone: UTC+3 (TRT)

Gülpınar is a neighbourhood in the municipality and district of Köyceğiz, Muğla Province, Turkey. Its population is 3,313 (2024).
