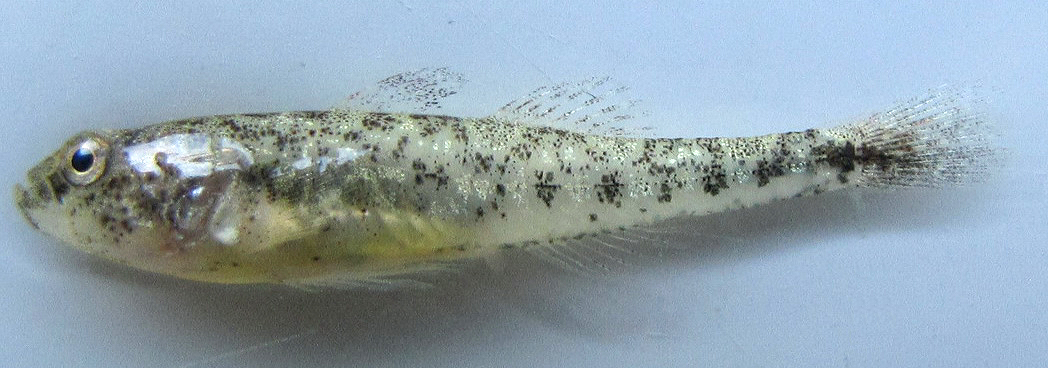

Conservation status
- Least Concern (IUCN 3.1)

Scientific classification
- Kingdom: Animalia
- Phylum: Chordata
- Class: Actinopterygii
- Order: Gobiiformes
- Family: Oxudercidae
- Genus: Knipowitschia
- Species: K. caucasica

Binomial name
- Knipowitschia caucasica (L. S. Berg, 1916)

Synonyms
- Pomatoschistus caucasicus L. S. Berg, 1916; Gobius lencoranicus Kessler, 1877 (ambiguous name); Gobius caucasicus Kavraisky, 1899; Bubyr caucasicus kosswigii Sözer, 1941

= Caucasian dwarf goby =

Species of fish

Knipowitschia caucasica, the Caucasian dwarf goby, is a species of goby native to marine, fresh and brackish waters along the coasts of the Black Sea, the Sea of Azov, the Caspian Sea and the Aegean Sea and to the Haliacmon drainage of Greece. It inhabits shallow waters (0 to 2 metres (0.0 to 6.6 ft)) with plentiful weed growth where it can find its prey consisting of small crustaceans, the larvae of chironomids and the larvae of the mussel Dreissena polymorpha. Spawning takes place after their first winter with the eggs being deposited onto the roof of a cavity formed by rocks, shells or plant materials. The male will remain to defend the eggs. This species can reach a length of 5 centimetres (2.0 in) TL
