= Macelo =

Greek mythological figure

In Greek mythology, Macelo or Makelo (Ancient Greek: Μακελώ) was one of the Rhodian Telchines. She was the mother of Dexithea by Demonax, or sometimes described as the daughter of Damon (Demonax), chiefest of the Telchines.

== Mythology ==
Because of the insolence of the Telchines, including Macelo and her husband, Zeus struck down all of them or in some accounts, together with her sister Dexithea, were the only survivors of their race. According to other scholia, all except Macelo, who was struck by lightning with her husband at her wedding because Demonax invited all the gods but Zeus.

=== Callimachus' account ===
And therewithal insolence and a lightning-death, and likewise the wizards the Telchins and Demonax who so foolishly flouted the blessed Gods—these the old man did put in his writing-tablets, and aged Macelo, mother of Dexithea, them twain that alone the Immortals left unharmed when they overturned an island for its sinful insolence.

=== Scholia on Ovid's account ===
It is said that Macelo and her sisters were daughters of Damon, and that Jupiter having enjoyed their hospitality saved them when he struck the Telchins, of whom Damon was chief, by lightning for maliciously blighting all the fruits of the earth.

=== Nonnus' account ===
Macello entertained Zeus and Apollo at one table . . . and when Earthshaker (Poseidon) had shattered the whole island (Rhodes) with his trident and rooted all the Phlegyans (Telchines) at the bottom of the sea, he saved both women (Macello and possibly Dexithea) and did not strike them down with the trident.
