= Celaenus (mythology) =

In Greek mythology, Celaenus (Ancient Greek: Κελαινός Kelainos) may refer to the following figures:

- Celaenus, son of Poseidon and the Danaid Celaeno.
- Celaenus, son of the autochthon Phlyus and father of Caucon.
- Celaenus or Celaeneus, father of Tragasia, the possible spouse of Miletus and mother of Byblis and Caunus.
