= Knipowitschia mermere =

Conservation status
- Vulnerable (IUCN 3.1)

Scientific classification
- Kingdom: Animalia
- Phylum: Chordata
- Class: Actinopterygii
- Order: Gobiiformes
- Family: Oxudercidae
- Genus: Knipowitschia
- Species: K. mermere

Binomial name
- Knipowitschia mermere Ahnelt, 1995

Species of fish

Knipowitschia mermere is a species of fresh water goby endemic to Lake Marmara and the associated basin of the River Gediz in Turkey where it can be found in shallow, poorly oxygenated water with plentiful weed growth. This species can reach a length of 2.4 centimetres (0.94 in) TL. Mermere
