= Knipowitschia ephesi =

Conservation status
- Critically Endangered (IUCN 3.1)

Scientific classification
- Kingdom: Animalia
- Phylum: Chordata
- Class: Actinopterygii
- Order: Gobiiformes
- Family: Oxudercidae
- Genus: Knipowitschia
- Species: K. ephesi

Binomial name
- Knipowitschia ephesi Ahnelt, 1995

Species of fish

Knipowitschia ephesi, the Ephesus goby, is a species of goby endemic to the delta and marshes of the lowermost Küçük Menderes in western Anatolia, Turkey.Turkey where it occurs in stagnant or nearly stagnant fresh waters. Its habitat is threatened by water abstraction, pollution, and destruction and these have an impact on this species, leading to the IUCN to classify it as Critically Endangered. The specific name refers to the ancient, ruined city of Ephesus which was a port located at mouth of the Küçük Menderes.
