= Norin goby =

Conservation status
- Vulnerable (IUCN 3.1)

Scientific classification
- Domain: Eukaryota
- Kingdom: Animalia
- Phylum: Chordata
- Class: Actinopterygii
- Order: Gobiiformes
- Family: Gobiidae
- Genus: Knipowitschia
- Species: K. radovici

Binomial name
- Knipowitschia radovici Kovačić, 2005

Species of fish

Knipowitschia radovici, the Norin goby, is a species of goby endemic to Croatia where it only occurs in the drainage basin of the Neretva River, where adults inhabit the deepest parts of the rivers (down to 5.5 metres (18 ft)) in the strongest current (juveniles are found in shallower waters). This species can reach a length of 2.8 centimetres (1.1 in) SL. The specific name honours the Ornithologist Dragan Radović, a friend of the author, Marcelo Kovačić, who encouraged him to sample in the waterbodies of Croatia.
