= Orsinigobius =

Scientific classification
- Kingdom: Animalia
- Phylum: Chordata
- Class: Actinopterygii
- Order: Gobiiformes
- Family: Oxudercidae
- Subfamily: Gobionellinae
- Genus: Orsinigobius; Gandolfi, Marconato & Torricelli, 1986

Genus of fishes

Orsinigobius is a genus of gobies native to Southern and Southeastern Europe.

== Species ==
There are currently two recognized species in this genus:

- Orsinigobius croaticus (Mrakovčić, Kerovec, Misetic & Schneider, 1996) (Neretva dwarf goby)
- Orsinigobius punctatissimus (Canestrini, 1864) (Italian spring goby)
