= Anax (mythology) =

In Greek mythology, Anax (Ancient Greek: Ἄναξ; from earlier ϝάναξ, wánax) was a king of Anactoria (Miletus). He was the son of Gaea (Earth) and father of Asterius. Anax' name means "tribal chief, lord, (military) leader".

== Mythology ==
According to the Milesians in Asia Minor, their land was called Anactoria for two generations, during the reigns of the eponymous founder Anax and his son Asterius who succeeded him in the throne. But later on, Miletus who was fleeing from King Minos, with a Cretan army in Anactoria, occupied the country and called it after himself.

== See also ==
- Anax (word)
- Anak
- Giants
- Anakim
