= Capheira =

Oceanid in Greek Mythology

In Greek mythology, Capheira (Ancient Greek: Καφείρας or Καφείρα Kapheira) was an Oceanid, as a daughter of the Titan of the Sea, Oceanus, possibly by his sister-wife Tethys. Her name means "stormy-breath" from eir and kaphos.

== Mythology ==
Capheira was a Rhodian nymph who became the nurse of the infant god Poseidon. Along with the Telchines, Capheira was committed by Rhea to the care and protection of the babe.
