= Knipowitschia thessala =

Conservation status
- Endangered (IUCN 3.1)

Scientific classification
- Kingdom: Animalia
- Phylum: Chordata
- Class: Actinopterygii
- Order: Gobiiformes
- Family: Oxudercidae
- Genus: Knipowitschia
- Species: K. thessala

Binomial name
- Knipowitschia thessala (Vinciguerra, 1921)

Synonyms
- Gobius thessalus Vinciguerra, 1921

Species of fish

Knipowitschia thessala, the Thessaly goby, is a species of goby endemic to the Pineios River system in Thessaly, Greece. This species can reach a length of 4.4 centimetres (1.7 in) TL.

== Taxonomy ==
The Thessaly goby was formally described by the Italian ichthyologist Decio Vinciguerra as Gobius thessalus based on specimens from Kefalovriso spring on Mount Ossa in Greece. It was subsequently moved to the genus Knipowitschia in 1990.

The genus is named in honor of the Russian ichthyologist Nikolai Mikhailovich Knipovich, while the species is named after Thessaly, Greece, where it was first discovered.

== Description ==
The Thessaly goby is a small fish. This species can reach a standard length of 4.4 cm in males and 4.3 cm in females. The front oculoscapular and preopercular head canals are present. Most scales are confined to an axillary patch, with some dispersed along the midline of the side of the caudal peduncle. Male gobies have many thin striae along the side.

== Distribution and ecology ==
The Thessaly goby is endemic to the Pineios River basin in the Thessalian Plain in central Greece. Its exact distribution is unclear; it was previously found in much of the lowland plain, but has now been extirpated from many sites and is now known from fewer than 10 locations. It inhabits a variety of freshwater habitats such as rivers, streams, wetlands, artificial drainage channels, and shallow reservoirs.

The Thessaly goby's reproductive biology has not been studied, but is thought to be similar to other species in its genus. In other Knipowitschia gobies, males build a nest inside a cavity and protect their eggs until they hatch. The breeding season lasts from spring to summer. Like other congeneric gobies, Thessaly gobies have short life cycles, with most individuals living for a maximum of 12–18 months. The species feeds on small crustaceans and other invertebrates inhabiting the benthic zone.

== Status ==
The species is listed as being endangered on the IUCN Red List. It has an very restricted range, with an estimated area of occupancy of 88 km^{2}, and is threatened by the fragmentation and degradation of its habitat. The Pineios River basin has been heavily modified for irrigated agriculture and the majority of the river's tributaries have been turned into canals or are impeded by artificial structures like weirs. These structures hinder the disperal of fish and degrade and fragment habitat throughout the basin. Water pollution in the region also threatens the Thessaly goby. Lake Karla is eutrophic and experiences algal blooms often, and is classified as a water body of poor/bad ecological status. More frequent and extended droughts caused by climate change are also worsening the effects of existing threats.

The Thessaly goby is found in multiple protected areas, including the Karla-Mavrovouni-Kefalovryso Velestinou-Neochori Special Protected Area, which includes the Lake Karla Permanent Wildlife Refuge. Efforts to restore and improve wetland habitat at Lake Karla beginning in 2000 have had a positive effect on the goby and the species is reportedly common in areas of the lake that have been restored.
