= Yeni, Köyceğiz =

Village in Turkey

Yeni
- Neighbourhood
- Location in Turkey Yeni (Turkey Aegean)
- Coordinates: 36°58′44″N 28°42′00″E
- Country: Turkey
- Province: Muğla
- District: Köyceğiz
- Population (2024): 2,835
- Time zone: UTC+3 (TRT)

Yeni is a neighbourhood in the municipality and district of Köyceğiz, Muğla Province, Turkey. Its population is 2,835 (2024).
