= Areia (mythology) =

Daughter of Cleochus in Greek mythology

In Greek mythology, Areia (Ancient Greek: Ἀρεία, lit. 'warlike') or Aria was the Cretan daughter of Cleochus. She became the mother by Apollo of Miletus.

== Mythology ==
When Areia gave birth to her son she hid him in a bed of smilax, Cleochus found the child there and named him Miletus after the plant.
