= Dexithea (mythology) =

Greek mythological figure

In Greek mythology, Dexithea (Ancient Greek: Δεξιθέα or Δεξιθέη) or Dexione was one of the Rhodian Telchines. She was the daughter of Damon (Demonax), chiefest of the Telchines, by Macelo. Together with King Minos of Crete, Dexithea became the mother of Euxantius.

== Mythology ==
Zeus struck down all of the Telchines with lightning or Poseidon with his trident because of their insolence to the gods. They only spared Dexithea or with her mother or sister Macelo, because of their kindness.

=== Callimachus' account ===
And therewithal insolence and a lightning-death, and likewise the wizards the Telchins and Demonax who so foolishly flouted the blessed Gods—these the old man did put in his writing-tablets, and aged Macelo, mother of Dexithea, them twain that alone the Immortals left unharmed when they overturned an island for its sinful insolence.

=== Pindar's account ===
Euxantius told them the marvel that once befell him:—' Surely I fear war with Zeus and the loud-thundering Earth-Shaker. Surely their levin-holt and trident sent a land and its people every man into deep Tartarus, all but my mother and her well-walled house.

=== Scholia on Ovid ===
It is said that Macelo and her sisters were daughters of Damon, and that Jupiter having enjoyed their hospitality saved them when he struck the Telchins, of whom Damon was chief, by lightning for maliciously blighting all the fruits of the earth. To these daughters came Minos, and was united with Dexione, and begat Euxantius father of the Euxantidae.
