= Neretva dwarf goby =

Conservation status
- Vulnerable (IUCN 3.1)

Scientific classification
- Kingdom: Animalia
- Phylum: Chordata
- Class: Actinopterygii
- Order: Gobiiformes
- Family: Oxudercidae
- Genus: Orsinigobius
- Species: O. croaticus

Binomial name
- Orsinigobius croaticus (Mrakovčić, Kerovec, Mišetić & D. Schneider, 1996)

Synonyms
- Knipowitschia punctatissima croatica Mrakovcic, Kerovec, Misetic & D. Schneider, 1996; Knipowitschia croatica Mrakovcic, Kerovec, Misetic & D. Schneider, 1996

Species of fish

Orsinigobius croaticus, the Neretva dwarf goby, is a species of fresh water ray-finned fish from the family Gobiidae. It is endemic to the western Balkans occurring in the Neretva drainage in Bosnia and Herzegovina and in Croatia in the Matica drainage, Neretva springs and Baćina lakes. This species can reach a length of 4.7 centimetres (1.9 in) SL.

The Neretva dwarf goby is found in clear karstic springs, lakes, streams with slow currents and smaller rivers. Their lifespan is less than 2 years. Spawning occurs I February after the first winter, the males defend the eggs which are placed in cavities beneath stones, plant material or mollusc shells. The juveniles are pelagic while the adults are benthic. In the summer months under drought conditions, this species may seek sanctuary in subterranean waterbodies. It is threatened by eutrophication, water pollution and abstraction and the alteration of its habitat, the IUCN therefore classify its conservation status as Vulnerable.
