= Telchines =

Greek minor gods, original inhabitants of Rhodes

In Greek mythology, the Telchines (Ancient Greek: Τελχῖνες, romanized: Telkhines) were the original inhabitants of the island of Rhodes and were known in Crete and Cyprus.

== Family ==
Their parents were either Pontus and Gaia or Tartarus and Nemesis or else they were born from the blood of castrated Uranus, along with the Erinyes. According to Diodorus Siculus, the Telchines were the offspring of Thalassa. They had flippers instead of hands and the heads of dogs and were known as fish children. In some accounts, Poseidon was described as the Telchines' father.

== Names ==
The following individual names are attested in various sources: Damon (Demonax); Mylas; Atabyrius; Antaeus (Actaeus), Megalesius, Ormenos (Hormenus), Lycus, Nicon and Mimon; Chryson, Argyron and Chalcon. Known female Telchines were Makelo, Dexithea (one of Damon's daughters), Halia and probably Lysagora (the attesting text is severely damaged).

Comparative table of Telchines' names and family
Relation	Name	Sources											
Relation	Name	Bacch.	Pindar	Callim.	Diod.	Ovid	Non.	Hesy.	Steph.	Tzetzes		Eust.	Unknown
Relation	Name	Sch.	Paean	Aitia	Bib. His.	Sch. Ibis	Diony.	Hesy.	Ethnica	on Theo.	Chiliades	Eust.	Unknown
Parentage	Tartarus and Nemesis	✓								✓ or			
Parentage	Thalassa				✓								
Parentage	Poseidon						✓						
Parentage	Gaia and blood of Uranus									✓ or			
Parentage	Gaia and Pontus									✓			
Parentage	Pontus and Thalassa												✓
Individual Names	Demonax or			✓									
Individual Names	Damon					✓							
Individual Names	Lycus				✓		✓			✓	✓		
Individual Names	Actaeus or									✓			
Individual Names	Antaeus										✓		
Individual Names	Megalesius									✓	✓		
Individual Names	Hormenius or Ormenos									✓	✓		
Individual Names	Damnameneus						✓						
Individual Names	Skelmis						✓						
Individual Names	Mylas							✓					
Individual Names	Atabyrius								✓				
Individual Names	Mimon										✓		
Individual Names	Nicon										✓		
Individual Names	Argyron											✓	
Individual Names	Chalcon											✓	
Individual Names	Chryson											✓	
Female Telchines	Dexithea or	✓	✓	✓									
Female Telchines	Dexione					✓							
Female Telchines	Halia				✓								
Female Telchines	Makelo or Macelo	✓		✓		✓	✓						
Female Telchines	Lysagora	✓											

== Roles ==
=== Ministers of gods ===
The Telchines were regarded as the cultivators of the soil and ministers of the gods and as such they came from Crete to Cyprus and from thence to Rhodes or they proceeded from Rhodes to Crete and Boeotia. Rhodes, and in it the three towns of Cameirus, Ialysos, and Lindos (whence the Telchines are called Ialysii), which was their principal seat and was named after them Telchinis (Sicyon also was called Telchinia) and by some accounts, their children were highly worshiped as gods in the said three ancient Rhodian towns. The Telchines abandoned their homes because they foresaw that the island would be inundated and thence they scattered in different directions; Lycus went to Lycia, where he built the temple of the Lycian Apollo. This god had been worshiped by them at Lindos (Apollôn Telchinios) and Hera at Ialysos and Cameiros (Hêra telchinia); and Athena at Teumessus in Boeotia bore the surname of Telchinia. Nymphs also are called after them Telchiniae.

=== Sorcerers and daemons ===
The Telchines were also regarded as wizards and envious daemons. Their very eyes and aspect were said to have been destructive. They had it in their power to bring on hail, rain, and snow, and to assume any form they pleased; they further produced a substance poisonous to living things. Thus, they were called Alastores for supervising the ceaseless wanderings of people and Palamnaioi for pouring the water of Styx with their palms and hands in order to make the fields infertile. The Telchines were described to have stings and being rough as the echinoid and thus, their names teliochinous that is “having a poisonous telos like an echinoid”.

=== Artists ===
The Telchines were said to have invented useful arts and institutions which were useful to mankind and to have made images of the gods. Telchines were regarded as excellent metallurgists; various accounts state that they were skilled metal workers in brass and iron and made a trident for Poseidon and a sickle for Cronus, both ceremonial weapons. Together with their help and the Cyclopes, the smith god Hephaestus forged the cursed necklace of Harmonia. Because of their excellent workmanship, the Telchines were maligned by rival workmen and thus received their bad reputation.

This last feature in the character of the Telchines seems to have been the reason of their being put together with the Idaean Dactyls and Strabo even states that those of the nine Rhodian Telchines who accompanied Rhea to Crete brought up the infant Zeus and were called Curetes. The Telchines were associated and sometimes confused with the Cyclopes, Dactyls, and Curetes.

== Mythology ==
The Telchines were entrusted by Rhea with the upbringing of Poseidon, which they accomplished with the aid of Capheira, one of Oceanus' daughters. Another version says that Rhea accompanied them to Crete from Rhodes, where nine of the Telchines, known as the Curetes, were selected to bring up Zeus.

However, in other versions of the tale, Rhea, Apollo, and Zeus were described as hostile to the Telchines. The gods (Zeus, Poseidon or Apollo) eventually killed them because they began to use magic for malignant purposes; particularly, they produced a mixture of Stygian water and sulfur, which killed animals and plants (according to Nonnus, they did so as revenge for being driven out of Rhodes by the Heliadae). Accounts vary on how exactly they were destroyed: by flood or Zeus's thunderbolt or Poseidon's trident or else Apollo assumed the shape of a wolf to kill them. They apparently lost the Titanomachy, the battle between the gods and the Titans.

Ovid in his Ibis mentions that Makelo, like the other Telchines, was killed with a thunderbolt; according to Callimachus and Nonnus, however, Makelo was the only one to be spared. According to Bacchylides, the survivor is Dexithea. Bacchylides also mentions that Dexithea later had a son Euxanthios by Minos. This Euxanthios is also known from Pindar's works.

In rare accounts, the Telchines were originally the dogs of Actaeon, who were changed into men.

== See also ==
- Cabeiri
