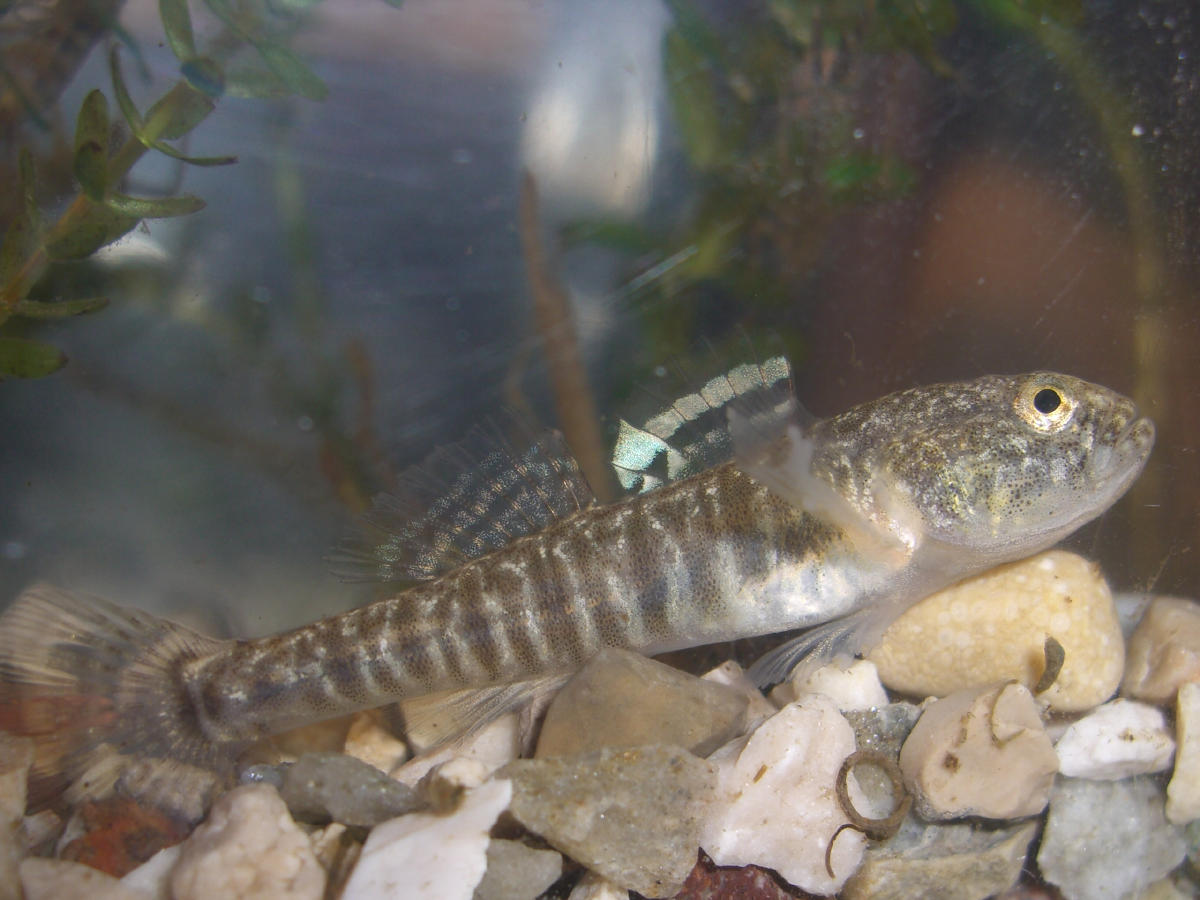

Conservation status
- Least Concern (IUCN 3.1)

Scientific classification
- Kingdom: Animalia
- Phylum: Chordata
- Class: Actinopterygii
- Order: Gobiiformes
- Family: Oxudercidae
- Genus: Orsinigobius
- Species: O. punctatissimus

Binomial name
- Orsinigobius punctatissimus (Canestrini, 1864)

Synonyms
- Gobius punctatissimus Canestrini, 1864; Knipowitschia punctatissima (Canestrini, 1864)

= Italian spring goby =

Species of fish

Orsinigobius punctatissimus, the Italian spring goby, is a species of goby endemic to Italy where it inhabits fresh, clear waters of springs, streams, and channels with slow water movements. This species can reach a length of 4.5 centimetres (1.8 in) SL.
