= Lake Köyceğiz =

Lake in Turkey

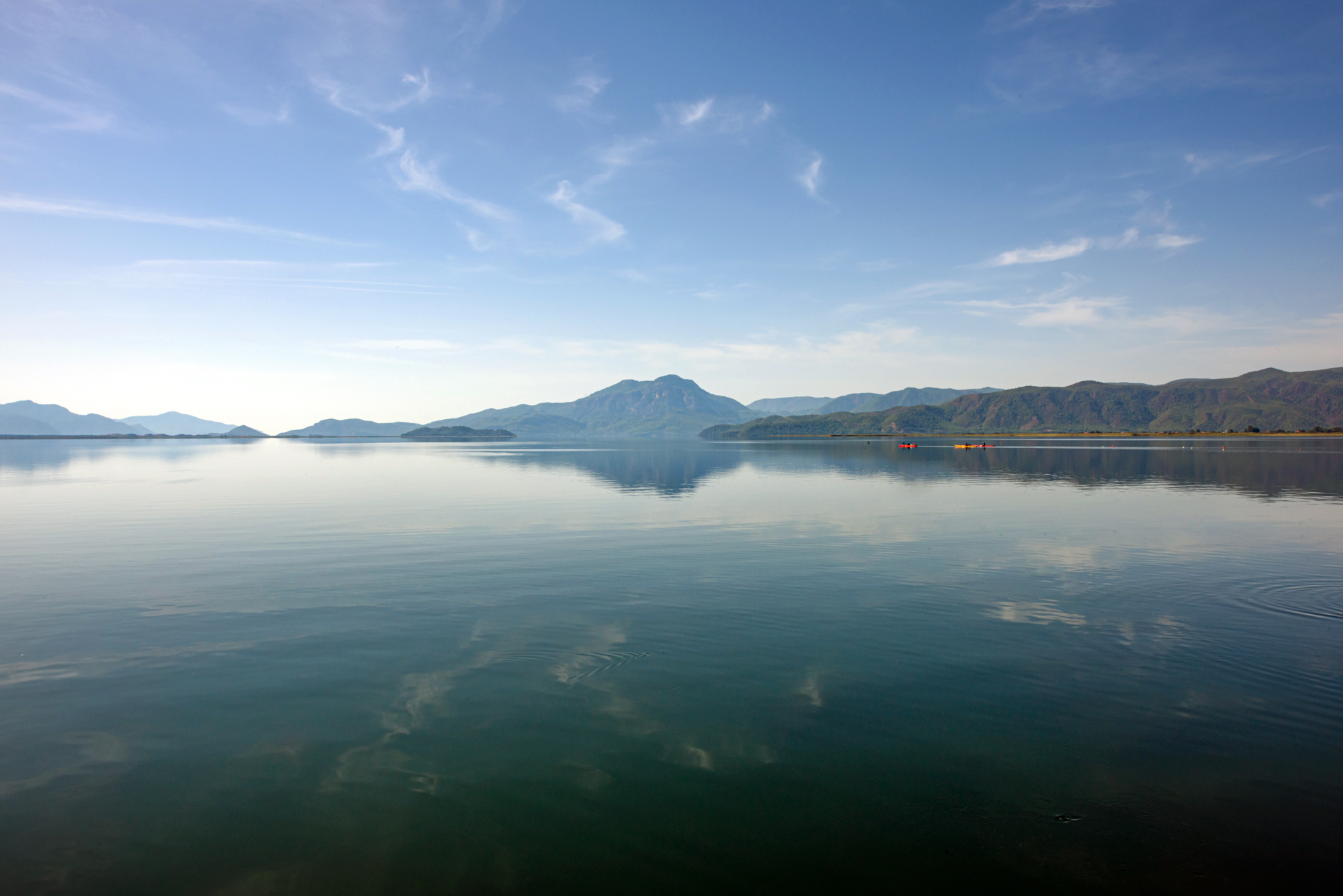
- Lake Köyceğiz

- Location within Turkey
- Location: Muğla Province
- Coordinates: 36°54′44″N 28°39′19″E
- Basin countries: Turkey

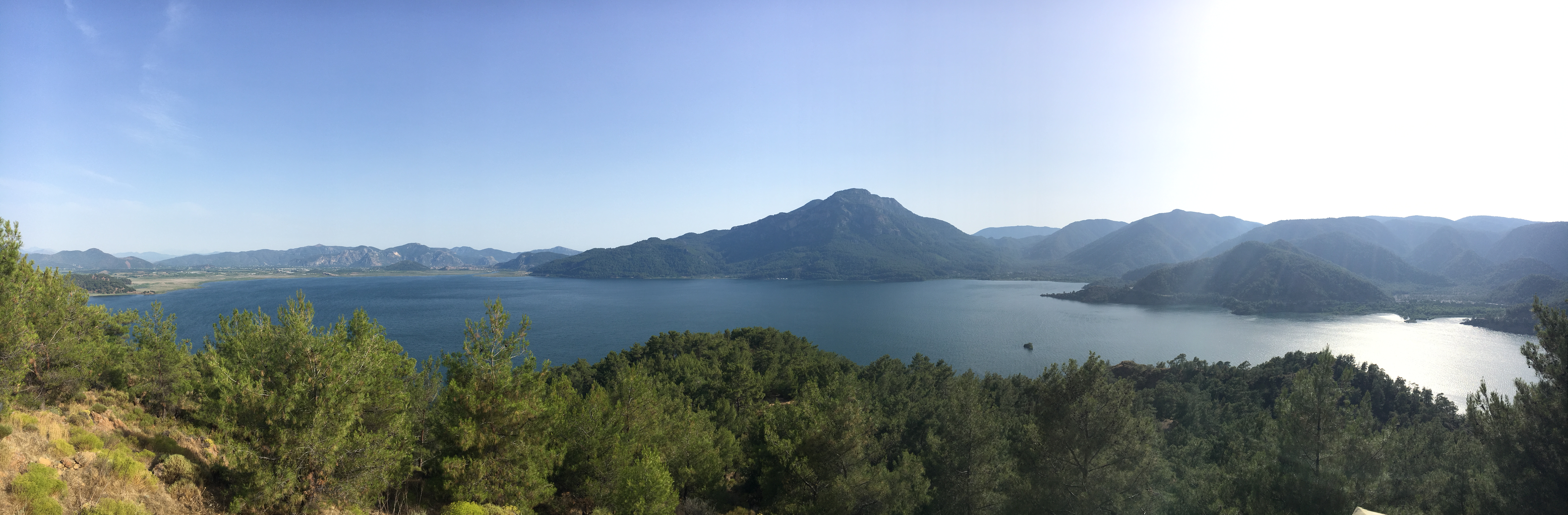
Panorama of Lake Köyceğiz

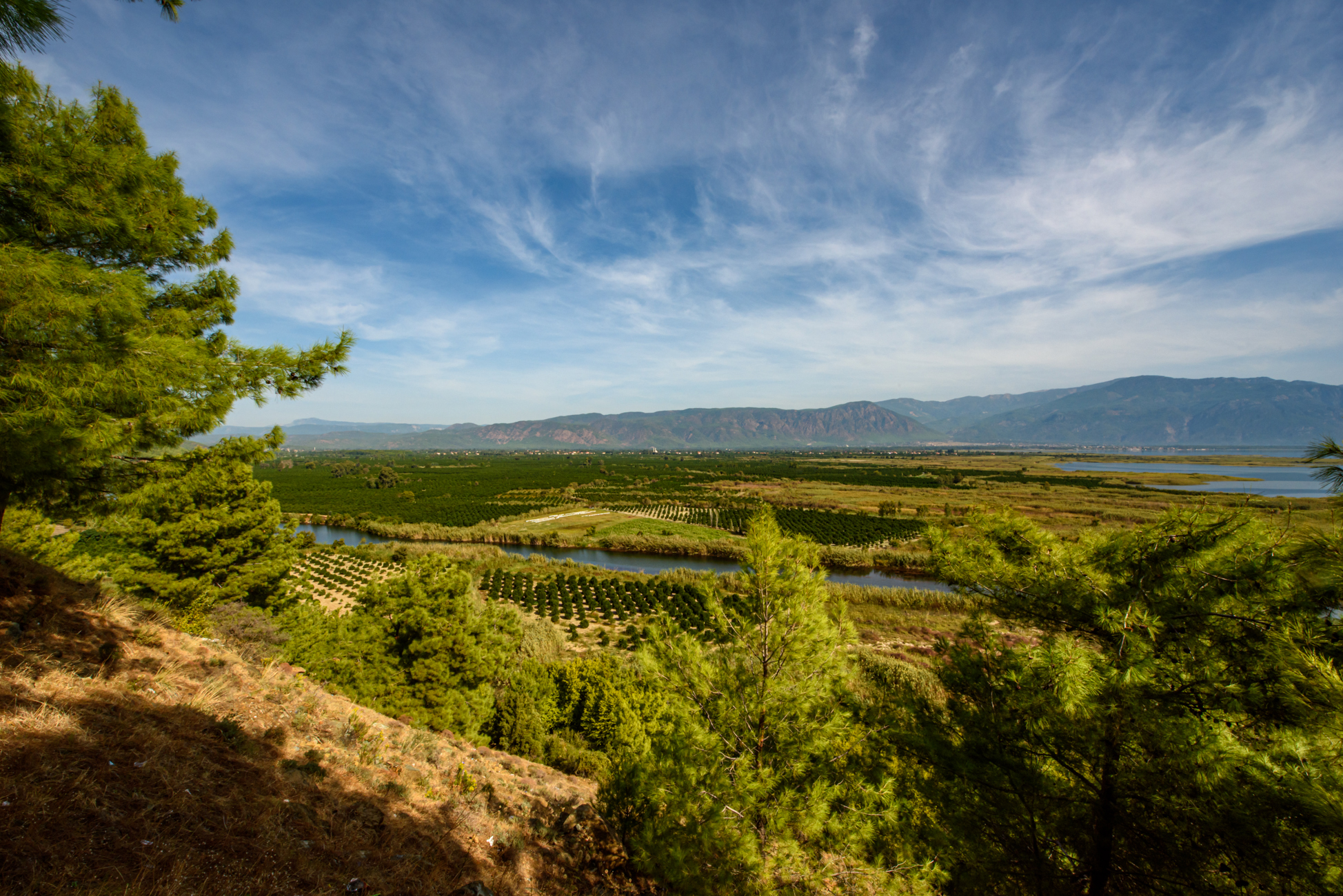
Agricultural land around the lake

Lake Köyceğiz is an alluvial set lake in the Muğla Province of Turkey. Having an area of 5200 hectares, it is one of the vastest coastal lakes in the country. It bears the name of the town of Köyceğiz, situated on its north bank. It is connected to the Mediterranean through a narrow and reedy channel called "Dalyan" which flows by a township of the same name (Dalyan) and the ancient city of Kaunos. Dalyan channel joins the sea at İztuzu Beach.

The surroundings of the lake as a whole and particularly the banks of its Dalyan sea connection are important nature reserves and popular tourist attractions. They are part of the Köyceğiz-Dalyan Special Environmental Protection Area.

== Characterization ==
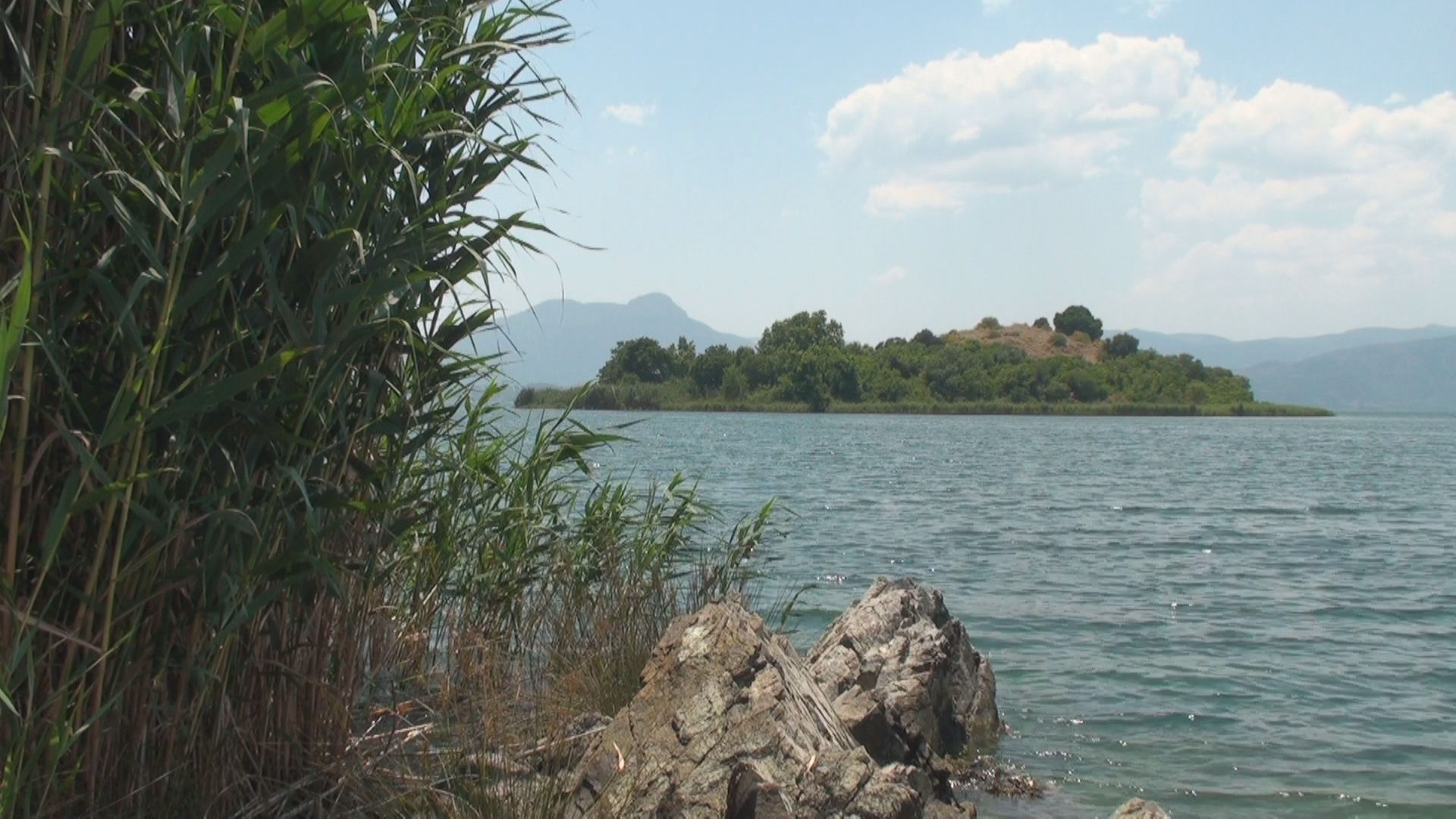
Island in Lake Köyceğiz

The lake is fed by the Namnam and Yuvarlakçay rivers and a number of mountain brooks. The water of brooks, melting water and fresh water wells, mixes with warm sulfurous water that is released from a fault and mildly brackish, oxygenated water that flows upriver with the rising tide. The depth of the lake varies from 20 to 60 metres. The lake is abundant with fish.

At the northeast and southeast of Köyceğiz Lake there are plains, whereas other parts are surrounded by hills. The highest of these are Ölemez Mountain (937 meter) in the southwest, and Bozburun Tepesi (556 meter) in the south. In the lake there are five uninhabited islands, one of which is known as Hapishane Adası, Prison Island. Initially the island was used for military purposes, then turned into a prison island. It is no longer in use as such and has been deserted.

== Geology ==
The lake was formed about 7500 years ago, when the entire eastern part of the Mediterranean was afflicted by earthquakes. On the south side of Köyceğiz Lake, there is a NW - SE fault line, bordered by several sulfurous hot springs, amongst them Sultaniye Spa.

== Special Protection Area ==
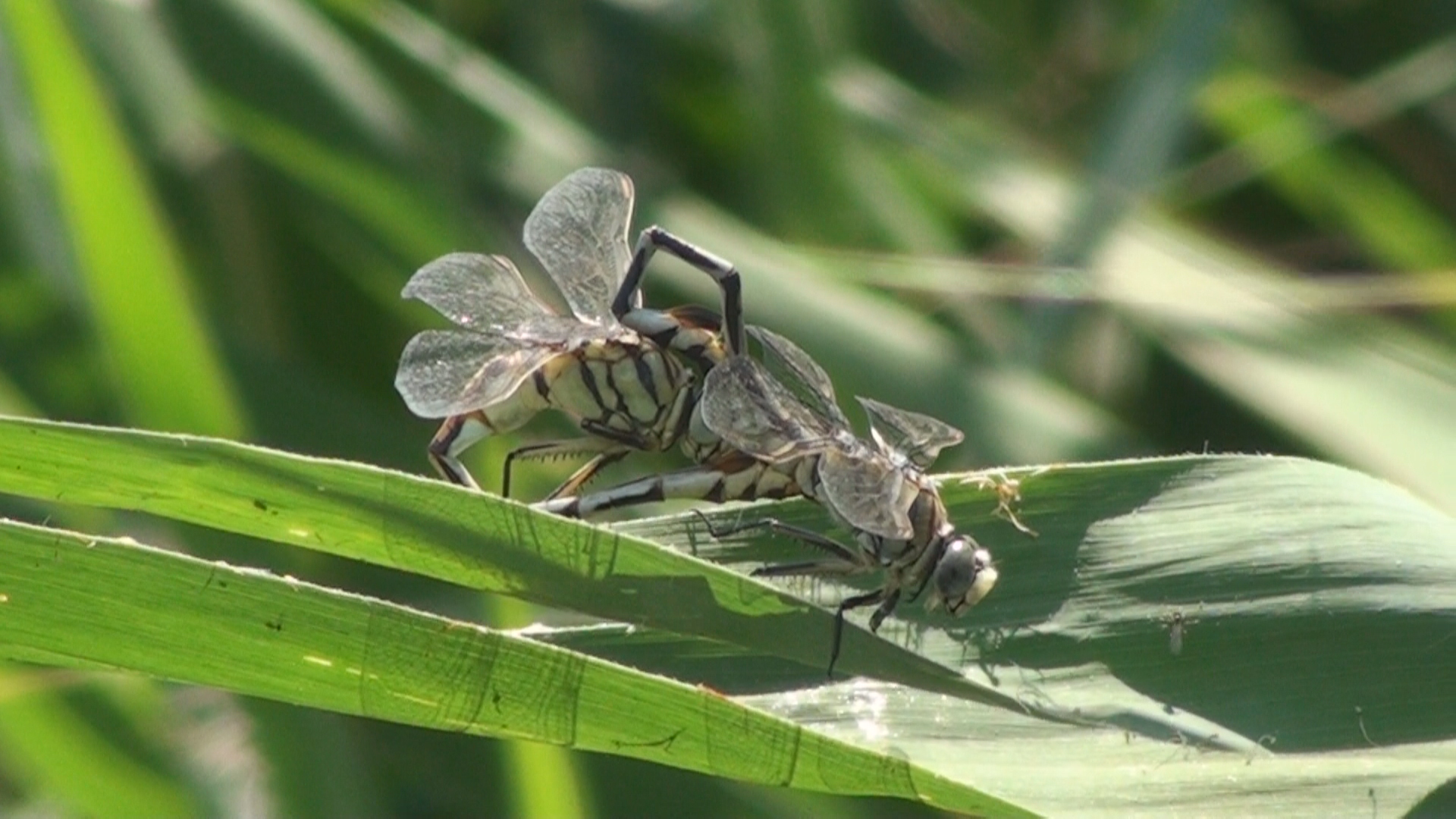
Dragonflies in the reeds

The lake has evolved into an ecologically important area. Together with its banks and the Dalyan basin it comprises the Köyceğiz-Dalyan Special Environmental Protection Area.

On the banks north of Sultaniye, northwest of Hamitköy, at Köyceğiz, at Kavakarası and at Tepearası, there are still vast marshy forests with the endemic Oriental Gumtree. The species primarily occurs in the province of Muğla, near Marmaris and in the Köyceğiz-Dalyan SEPA. The small wetlands around the lake are interesting because of their birdlife. The area attracts many birdwatchers. The area is also rich with reptiles (tortoises, turtles, terrapins, and snakes) and insects (dragonflies, damselflies). Among the fish species in the lake are two endemic dwarf gobies, Knipowitschia byblisia and K. caunosi, which were only described to science in 2011.

== External links and other sources ==
- Köyceğiz-Dalyan Special Environmental Protection Area; Environmental Protection Agency for Special Areas
- History surfaces from Köyceğiz Lake, Land of Lights, October 28th, 2010
- Dynamics of Lake Köyceğiz, SW Turkey: An environmental isotopic and hydrochemical study, C.S. BAYARI, T. KURTTAS, L. TEZCAN
- Dalyan 2005 Gezi Kitabı, Fatih Akaslan, ISBN 975-270-471-9
- Köyceğiz-Dalyan (A journey through the history within the labyrinth of nature, Altan Türe, Faya Kültür Yayınları-1, 2011, ISBN 978-978-978-605-3
- Cornucopia magazine, 20th edition, 2000: Reflections on Water; The Lake: part 1; author: Lady Patricia Daunt
