= Köyceğiz =

- District and municipality
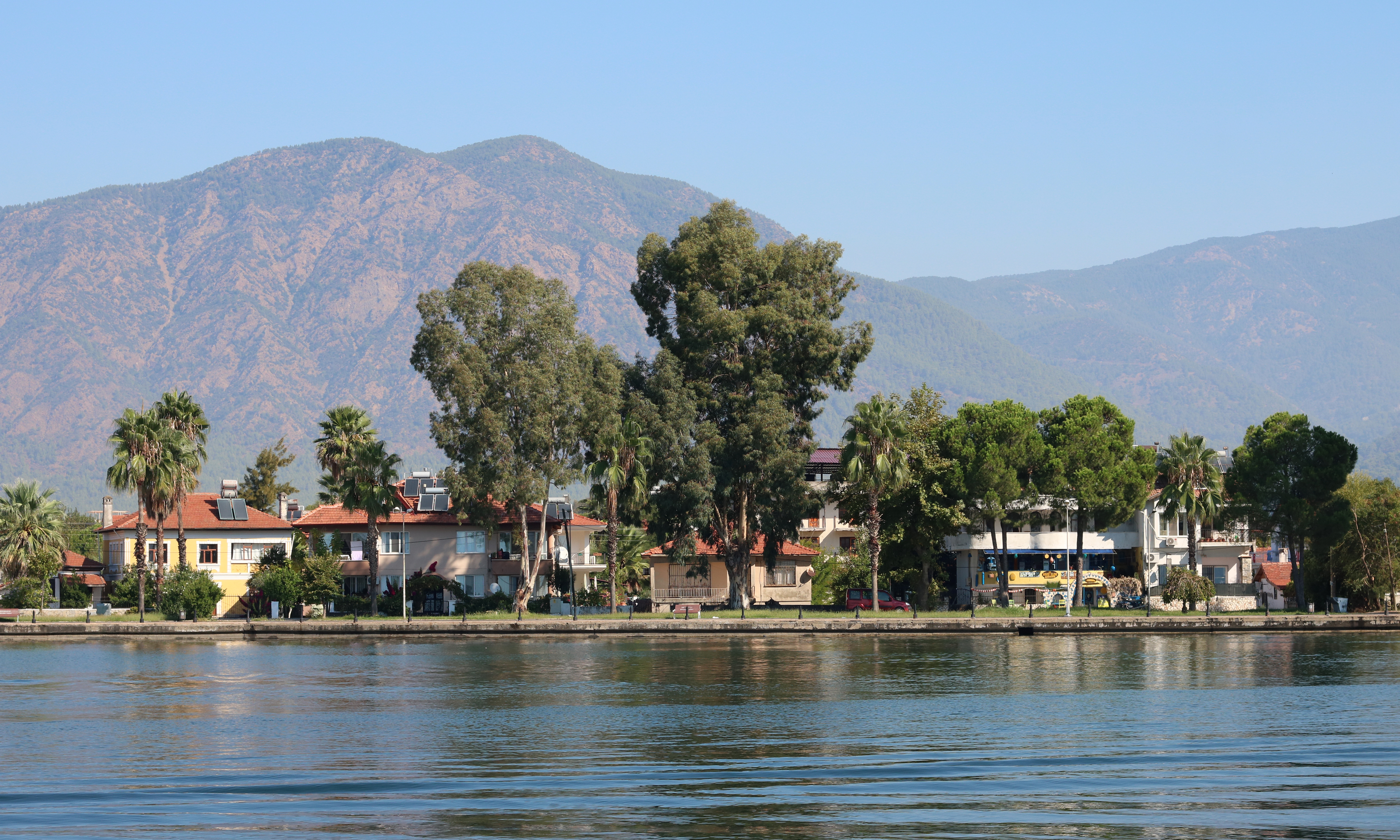

- Map showing Köyceğiz District in Muğla Province

- Location within Turkey Location within Turkey Aegean
- Coordinates: 36°58′17″N 28°41′20″E
- Country: Turkey
- Province: Muğla

Government
  - Mayor: Ali Erdoğan (CHP)
- Area: 1,329 km^{2} (513 sq mi)
- Elevation: 27 m (89 ft)
- Population (2022): 39,242
  - Density: 29.53/km^{2} (76.48/sq mi)
- Time zone: UTC+3 (TRT)
- Postal code: 48800
- Area code: 0252
- Website: www.koycegiz.bel.tr

Köyceğiz is a municipality and district of Muğla Province, Turkey. Its area is 1,329 km^{2}, and its population is 39,242 (2022).

The town of Köyceğiz lies at the northern end of a lake of the same name (Lake Köyceğiz) which is joined to the Mediterranean Sea by a natural channel called Dalyan Delta. Its unique environment is being preserved as a nature and wildlife sanctuary, the Köyceğiz-Dalyan Special Environmental Protection Area. A road shaded with trees leads to the township that carries the same name as the river, Dalyan, which is situated on the inland waterway and is administratively a part of the neighboring district of Ortaca. Dalyan is highly popular with visitors and its maze of channels can be explored by boat. The restaurants which line the waterways specialize in fresh fish. High on the cliff face, at a bend in the river, above the ancient harbor city of Caunos, tombs were carved into the rocks. The Dalyan Delta, with a long, golden sandy beach at its mouth, is a nature conservation area and a refuge for rare loggerhead turtles (Caretta caretta) and blue crabs.

== Composition ==
There are 25 neighbourhoods in Köyceğiz District:

- Akköprü
- Balcılar
- Beyobası
- Çandır
- Çayhisar
- Döğüşbelen
- Ekincik
- Gelişim
- Gülpınar
- Hamitköy
- Karaçam
- Kavakarası
- Köyceğiz
- Otmanlar
- Pınar
- Sazak
- Sultaniye
- Toparlar
- Ulucami
- Yangı
- Yayla
- Yeni
- Yeşilköy
- Zaferler
- Zeytinalanı

== Climate ==
Köyceğiz has a hot-summer Mediterranean climate (Köppen: Csa), with very hot, dry summers, and mild, rainy winters.

Climate data for Köyceğiz (1991–2020)
| Month | Jan | Feb | Mar | Apr | May | Jun | Jul | Aug | Sep | Oct | Nov | Dec | Year |
|---|---|---|---|---|---|---|---|---|---|---|---|---|---|
| Mean daily maximum °C (°F) | 15.7 (60.3) | 16.6 (61.9) | 19.5 (67.1) | 23.0 (73.4) | 28.1 (82.6) | 33.9 (93.0) | 36.9 (98.4) | 36.8 (98.2) | 33.2 (91.8) | 27.9 (82.2) | 21.8 (71.2) | 16.8 (62.2) | 25.9 (78.6) |
| Daily mean °C (°F) | 9.2 (48.6) | 10.2 (50.4) | 12.6 (54.7) | 16.0 (60.8) | 20.9 (69.6) | 26.2 (79.2) | 29.0 (84.2) | 28.8 (83.8) | 25.0 (77.0) | 19.8 (67.6) | 14.3 (57.7) | 10.4 (50.7) | 18.6 (65.5) |
| Mean daily minimum °C (°F) | 4.1 (39.4) | 4.8 (40.6) | 6.4 (43.5) | 9.6 (49.3) | 13.8 (56.8) | 18.3 (64.9) | 21.0 (69.8) | 21.1 (70.0) | 17.4 (63.3) | 13.0 (55.4) | 8.5 (47.3) | 5.6 (42.1) | 12.0 (53.6) |
| Average precipitation mm (inches) | 220.1 (8.67) | 158.26 (6.23) | 106.27 (4.18) | 68.89 (2.71) | 43.56 (1.71) | 10.04 (0.40) | 5.77 (0.23) | 2.65 (0.10) | 21.83 (0.86) | 109.92 (4.33) | 160.26 (6.31) | 209.41 (8.24) | 1,116.96 (43.97) |
| Average precipitation days (≥ 1.0 mm) | 10.9 | 9.6 | 8.0 | 6.5 | 4.6 | 2.1 | 1.2 | 1.6 | 2.5 | 4.7 | 7.0 | 10.1 | 68.8 |
| Average relative humidity (%) | 72.2 | 69.9 | 67.1 | 65.9 | 62.0 | 53.1 | 51.1 | 54.7 | 56.5 | 64.6 | 71.1 | 74.8 | 63.5 |
Source: NOAA

== Education ==
There are two kindergartens, 21 primary schools, 16 secondary schools, eight high schools, one public education center, one science and art center, and one teacher's house and art school affiliated with Ministry of National Education in the district.
