= Corfu dwarf goby =

Conservation status
- Near Threatened (IUCN 3.1)

Scientific classification
- Kingdom: Animalia
- Phylum: Chordata
- Class: Actinopterygii
- Order: Gobiiformes
- Family: Oxudercidae
- Genus: Knipowitschia
- Species: K. goerneri

Binomial name
- Knipowitschia goerneri Ahnelt, 1991

Species of fish

The Corfu dwarf goby (Knipowitschia goerneri) is a species of freshwater goby endemic to the island of Corfu in western Greece.

== Taxonomy ==
The Corfu dwarf goby was formally described as Knipowitschia goerneri by the Austrian ichthyologist Harold Anhelt in 1991 based on specimens from Korission Lagoon on Corfu island. The genus is named in honor of the Russian ichthyologist Nikolai Mikhailovich Knipovich. The specific name honours Manfred Görner, who supported the ichthyological research of Harold Ahnelt.

The Corfu dwarf goby is very closely related to the Acheron spring goby and some authors have suggested that the two species should be lumped. However, studies of morphology and genetic data currently support the distinctness of these two species. However, the ranges of the two species are not well-defined where they meet, and a population of gobies that occurs on the island of Zakynthos in the Ionian Sea may belong to either of the species.

== Description ==
The Corfu dwarf goby is a small fish. This species can reach a standard length of 2.2 centimetres (0.87 in). It is very distinctive within its genus due to its complete lack of head canals and highly reduced body scalation.

== Distribution and ecology ==
The Corfu dwarf goby was formerly thought to be endemic to the island of Corfu in Greece, but has a larger range in the western Ionian Sea. It occurs from Lake Butrint in southern Albania south to Lake Kaiafas in Greece It is known from the Louros and Achelous river basins and Lake Trichonida in Greece. It has also been introduced to three lagoons in Circeo National Park, Italy. It inhabits fairly still vegetated freshwater springs and streams with muddy or sandy bottoms. It also occurs in brackish lagoons and salt marshes, and is euryhaline and eurythermal.

The Corfu dwarf goby's reproductive biology has not been studied, but is thought to be similar to other species in its genus. In other Knipowitschia gobies, males build a nest inside a cavity and protect their eggs until they hatch. The breeding season lasts from spring to summer. Like other congeneric gobies, Corfu dwarf gobies have short life cycles, with most individuals living for a maximum of 12–18 months. The species feeds on small crustaceans and other invertebrates inhabiting the benthic zone.

== Conservation ==
The species is listed as being vulnerable on the IUCN Red List. It has an fairly restricted range and is threatened by habitat degradation caused by wetland drainage, water pollution, and urban development. Other threats include competition with invasive fish.

This species was previously only recorded in 1968 and 1983; subsequent surveys in the 1990s failed to find any. It was thought that the destruction of Gardiki Spring, erroneously though to be the type locality of the species, may have led to the extinction of the fish, but the species had never been recorded from that spring. In 2014, nine specimens of Corfu dwarf goby were collected from Korission Lagoon in southern Corfu.

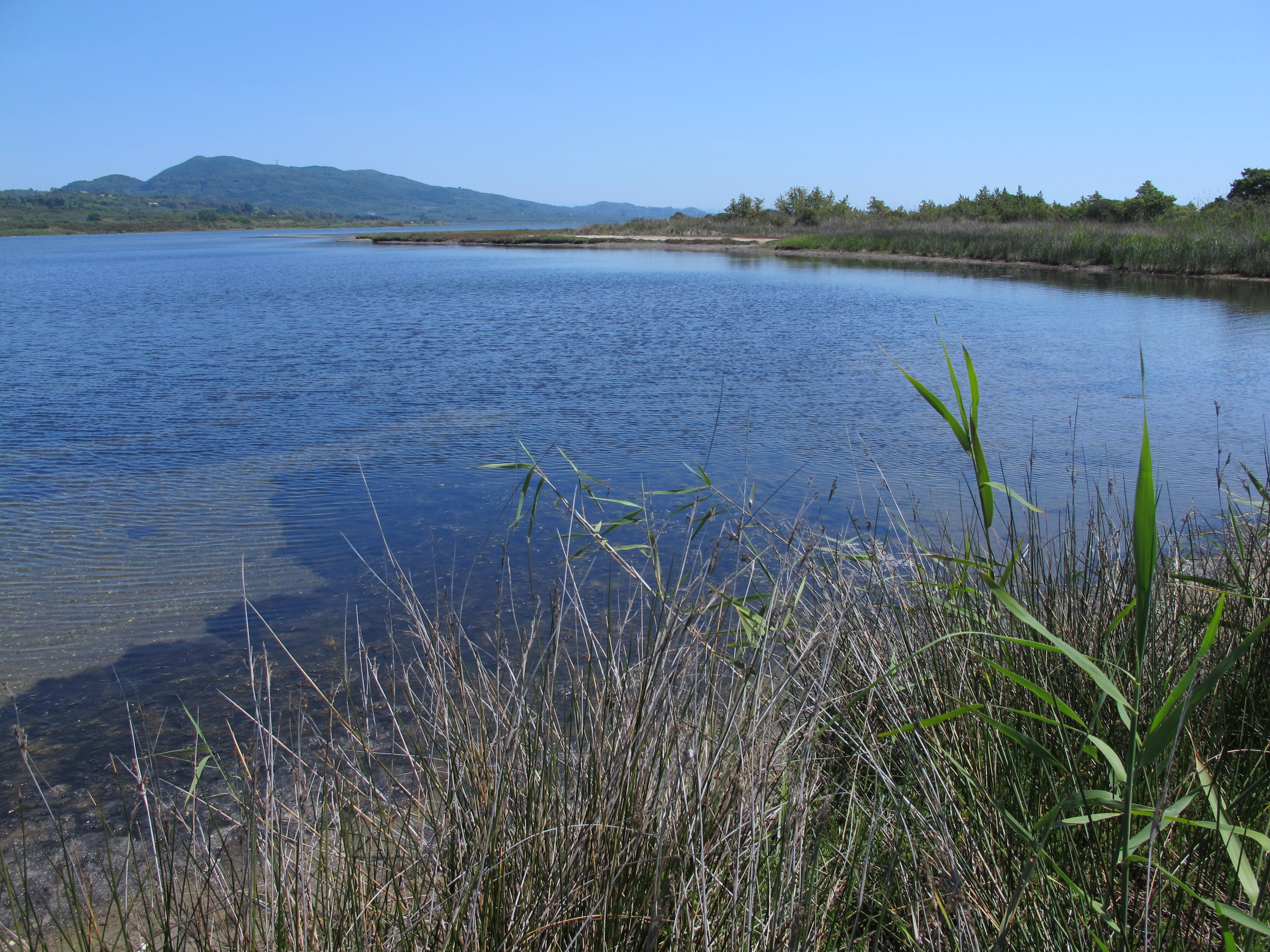
Lake Korission
