= Boris Sergeevich Iljin =

Boris Sergeyevich Ilyin
- Born: 1889
- Died: 1958 (aged 68–69)
- Citizenship: Russian Empire, Soviet Union
- Awards: Medal "For Valiant Labour in the Great Patriotic War 1941–1945"; Medal "In Commemoration of the 800th Anniversary of Moscow"; Stalin Prize (1950)
- Scientific career
- Fields: Ichthyology
- Workplaces: VNIRO

Boris Sergeyevich Ilyin (1889–1958) was a Soviet zoologist and ichthyologist. He held a Doctor of Biological Sciences degree and was a professor. He was a recipient of the Stalin Prize, 3rd degree (1950).

== Biography ==
Ilyin was born in 1889. From 1927, he worked at VNIRO. Ilyin was a prominent specialist in the taxonomy and fisheries of gobies in the southern seas of the Soviet Union. He described numerous species of fish and marine invertebrates. He died in 1958. His urn was buried in the columbarium of Donskoye Cemetery.

== Scientific works ==
- Ilyin, B. S. "Gobies of the northwestern region of the Black Sea basin." Proceedings of the State Ichthyological Experimental Station. Kherson, 1927, issue 1, pp. 93–108.
- Ilyin, B. S. "A key to the gobies (Fam. Gobiidae) of the Azov and Black Seas (preliminary report)." Proceedings of the Azov–Black Sea Scientific and Fisheries Expedition, 1927, no. 2, pp. 128–143.

== Awards ==
- Stalin Prize, 3rd degree (1950) — for work on the acclimatization of Black Sea mullets in the Caspian Sea.
