= Caunos (mythology) =

Mythical son of Miletus and Cyane

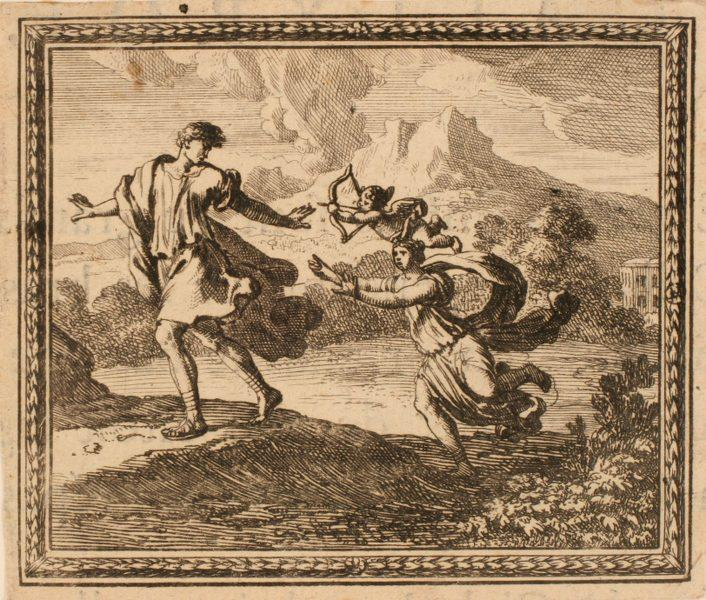
Caunos (mythology)

In Greek mythology, Caunos, Caunus or Kaunos (Ancient Greek: Καῦνος) was a son of Miletus, grandson of Apollo and brother of Byblis.

== Mythology ==
Caunus became the object of his own sister's passionate love. From some accounts it appears that Caunus was the first to develop the affection towards her; others describe Byblis' feelings as unrequited. All sources agree, however, that Caunus chose to flee from home in order to prevent himself from actually committing incest with Byblis, and that she followed him until she was completely exhausted by grief and died (or committed suicide).

Caunus eventually came to Lycia, where he married the Naiad Pronoe and had by her a son Aegialus. Caunus became king of the land; when he died, Aegialus gathered all the people from scattered settlements in a newly founded city which he named Caunus after his father.
