= Ortaca =

- District and municipality
- Map showing Ortaca District in Muğla Province

- Location within Turkey Location within Turkey Aegean
- Coordinates: 36°50′20″N 28°45′52″E
- Country: Turkey
- Province: Muğla

Government
  - Mayor: Evren Tezcan (CHP)
- Area: 285 km^{2} (110 sq mi)
- Elevation: 29 m (95 ft)
- Population (2022): 54,478
  - Density: 191/km^{2} (495/sq mi)
- Time zone: UTC+3 (TRT)
- Postal code: 48600
- Area code: 0252
- Website: www.ortaca.bel.tr

Ortaca (Turkish pronunciation: [oɾtadʒa]) is a municipality and district of Muğla Province, Turkey. Its area is 285 km^{2}, and its population is 54,478 (2022). Formerly a township part of Köyceğiz district, it was made into a separate district in 1987.

Ortaca's economy is based on agriculture. It lies midway between Dalaman and Köyceğiz. Its name literally means "the town in the middle," possibly a reference to its location in the middle of the surrounding plain. The main agricultural products of the district include tomatoes, citrus fruits, cotton, and pomegranates.

== Composition ==
There are 27 neighbourhoods in Ortaca District:

- Akıncı
- Arıkbaşı
- Atatürk
- Bahçelievler
- Beşköprü
- Çaylı
- Cumhuriyet
- Dalaklı
- Dalyan
- Dereköy
- Dikmekavak
- Ekşiliyurt
- Eskiköy
- Fevziye
- Gökbel
- Gölbaşı
- Güzelyurt
- Karaburun
- Karadonlar
- Kemaliye
- Mergenli
- Okçular
- Sarıgerme
- Tepearası
- Terzialiler
- Yerbelen
- Yeşilyurt

== Education ==
There are two kindergartens, 15 primary schools, 10 secondary schools, 5 high schools, one public education center, one special education practice school affiliated with Ministry of National Education in the district.

- Blue Cruise
- Foreign purchases of real estate in Turkey
- Lycia

Ortaca Vocational School, part of Muğla Sıtkı Koçman University, offers a two-year associate degree programme in Cookery within the Department of Hotel, Restaurant and Catering Services. Students who complete the programme receive a diploma and can undertake internships as part of their training. The curriculum includes practical and theoretical courses covering kitchen techniques, food and beverage service, guest relations, menu planning, and hospitality management. The cookery programme requires students to complete 120 ECTS credits and includes a period of internship work in related businesses. Admission is made through the national higher education placement examination, and students are assessed through a combination of mid-term and final exams. The programme aims to provide practical skills and knowledge needed for employment in the catering and food service sectors.

== Agriculture ==
A study in the Ortaca district recorded 38 wild plant species used by residents for food, medicine, and decoration. The study shows traditional knowledge and the use of plants in the region. Research on macrofungi in the district found 44 different species. The study provides information about the biodiversity and ecological features of the area.
