= Byblis =

Character in Greek mythology

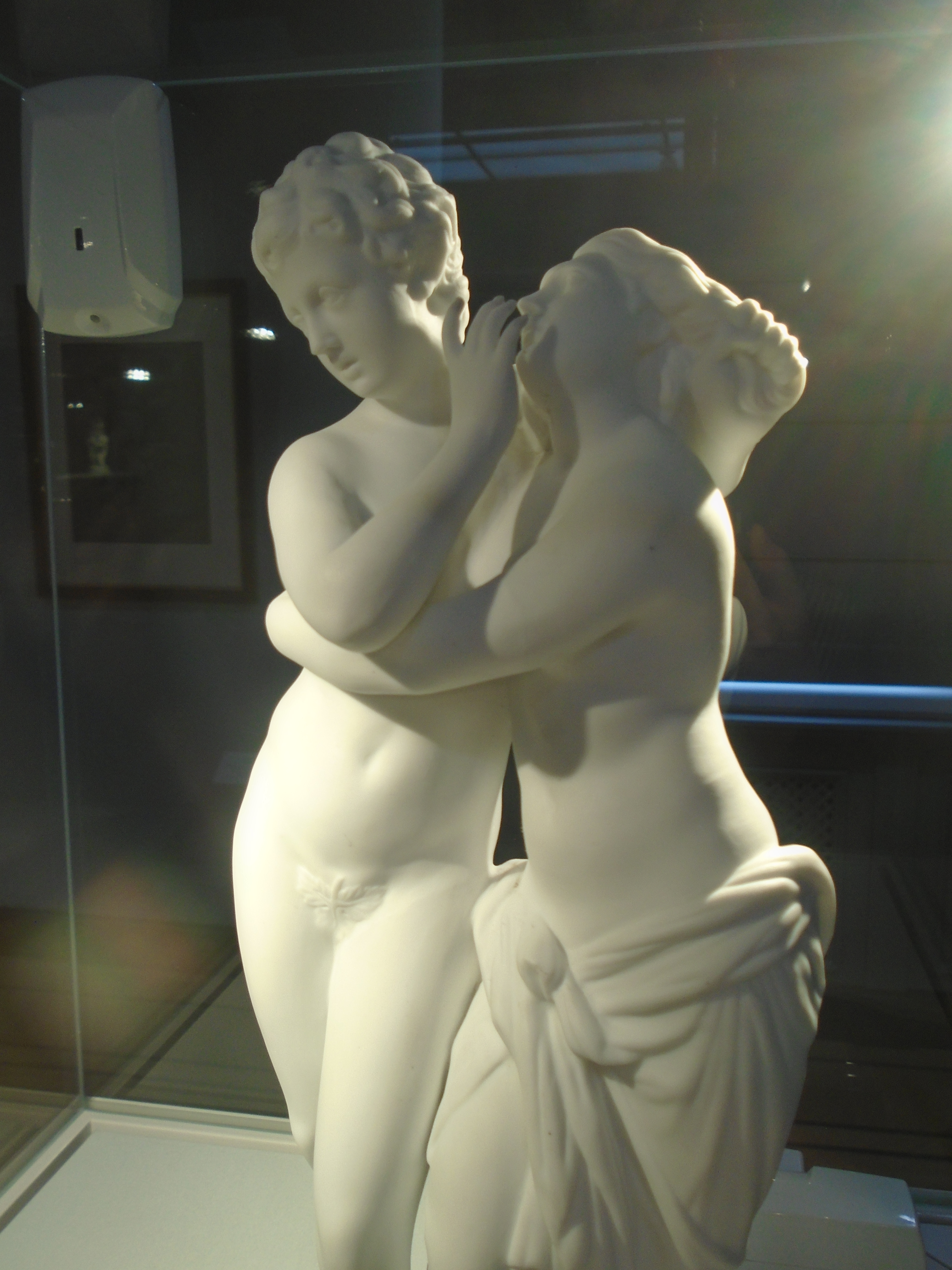
A Statue Of Byblis and Her Twin Brother, Caunos.

In Greek mythology, Byblis or Bublis (Ancient Greek: Βυβλίς) was a daughter of Miletus. Her mother was either Tragasia, daughter of Celaenus; Cyanee, daughter of the river-god Meander; or Eidothea, daughter of King Eurytus of Caria. She fell in love with Caunus, her twin brother.

== Mythology ==
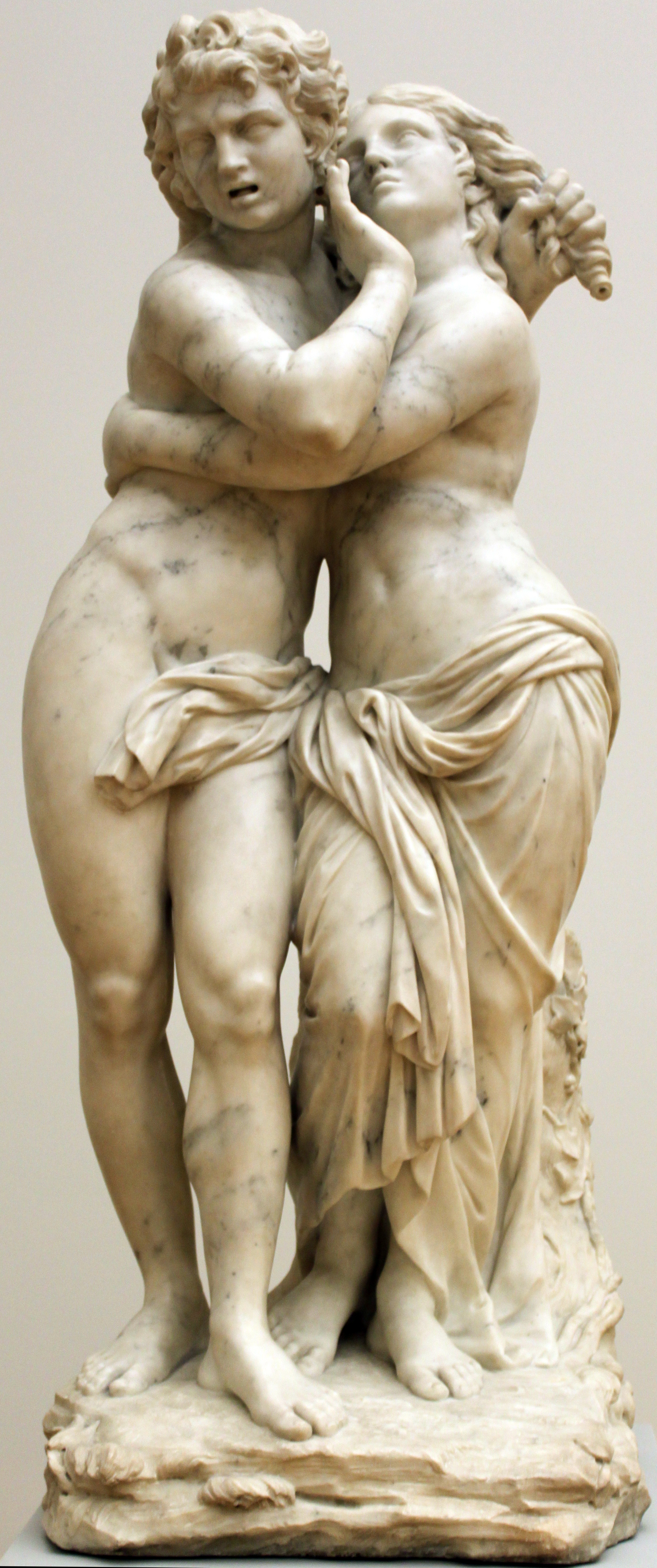
Byblis and Caunus by Laurent Delvaux, 1734, Bode Museum

=== Ovid ===
The most elaborate interpretation of her story is that of Ovid, and runs as follows. Byblis acknowledged her love for Caunus, and despite her initial efforts to convince herself that her feelings were natural, she realized the inappropriateness of them. Unable to keep her love for Caunus a secret from him any longer, she sent him a long love letter through a servant giving examples of other incestuous relationships between the gods. Disgusted, he ran away. Believing that she could yet make him love her, she was determined to try to woo him once more. When she found out that he had fled, she tore her clothes and stripped naked in sorrow and was driven into madness. She followed him through much of Greece and Asia Minor until she finally died, worn out by her grief and the long journey. As she had been constantly crying, she was changed into a spring.

=== Parthenius ===
Parthenius of Nicaea cites two versions of Byblis' story, one of which is generally the same as that recounted by Ovid, but ends with Byblis hanging herself with her girdle. In the other version, it is Caunus who instigates the incest, but Byblis still seems to return his affection; Caunus then leaves home before he can lose control over his desires, and Byblis, after a long search for him, makes a noose of her garment and hangs herself. The same version is followed by Conon.

=== Antoninus ===
Antoninus Liberalis again portrays Byblis as overcome with unanswered love for her brother; after Caunus leaves, she rejects the proposals of numerous suitors and attempts to commit suicide by jumping off a cliff, but is saved by hamadryads, who cause her to fall asleep and transform her into a fellow nymph.

=== Nonnus ===
Nonnus depicts Byblis, Caunos and Miletus as the children of Asterius, son of Minos and Androgeneia. In this account, Caunus romantically pursues Byblis with a love song referencing the incestuous relationships between the gods.

All the authors make mention of a spring which was believed to have appeared from Byblis' incessant tears.

The city Byblos in Phoenicia was believed to have taken its name from Byblis.

== Caunus and Byblis in art ==
Between 1706 and 1715, the sculptor Pierre Le Gros the Younger, working in Rome, was faced with the restoration of a fragmented antique group of Amor and Psyche for the Portuguese ambassador. Thriving on invention, he turned the love story on its head and depicted the theme of Caunus and Byblis in which Caunus vehemently defends himself against the sexual advances of his sister. While Le Gros' invention ended up in Germany and was purified back to Amor and Psyche before being destroyed in a fire in 1931, it triggered a rafter of drawings, reproductions and copies by for example Pompeo Batoni, Francesco Carradori, Martin Gottlieb Klauer and, best known of all, two marble versions by Laurent Delvaux. The most faithful impression of what Le Gros' invention looked like is a plaster cast in Tiefurt House near Weimar.

== See also ==
- Incest between twins
