= List of populated places in Muğla Province =

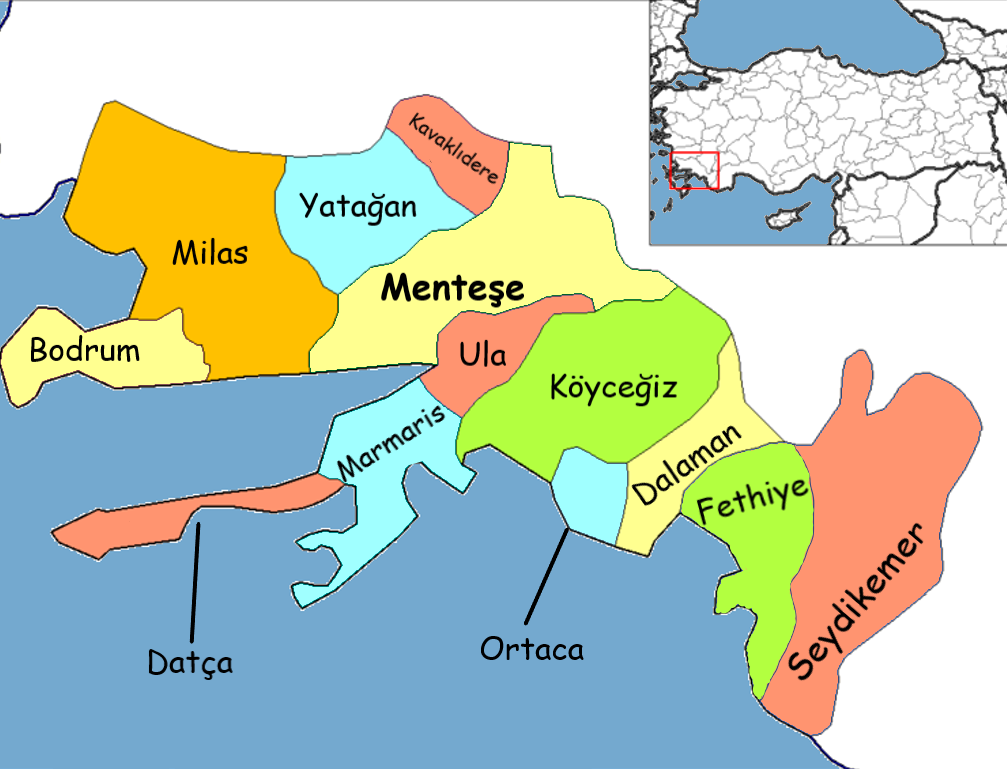
Muğla Province

Below is the list of populated places in Muğla Province, Turkey by the districts. In the following lists first place in each list is the administrative center of the district.

== Muğla ==
- Muğla
- Akçaova, Muğla
- Akkaya, Muğla
- Akyer, Muğla
- Algı, Muğla
- Avcılar, Muğla
- Bağyaka, Muğla
- Bayır, Muğla
- Bozyer, Muğla
- Çakmak, Muğla
- Çamoluk, Muğla
- Çaybükü, Muğla
- Çırpı, Muğla
- Çiftlik, Muğla
- Dağdibi, Muğla
- Dağpınar, Muğla
- Denizova, Muğla
- Derinkuyu, Muğla
- Doğan, Muğla
- Dokuzçam, Muğla
- Esençay, Muğla
- Fadıl, Muğla
- Gazeller, Muğla
- Göktepe, Muğla
- Gülağzı, Muğla
- Günlüce, Muğla
- İkizce, Muğla
- Kafaca, Muğla
- Karacaören, Muğla
- Kıran, Muğla
- Kozağaç, Muğla
- Kuyucak, Muğla
- Kuzluk, Muğla
- Meke, Muğla
- Muratlar, Muğla
- Ortaköy, Muğla
- Özlüce, Muğla
- Paşapınarı, Muğla
- Salihpaşalar, Muğla
- Sarnıç, Muğla
- Sungur, Muğla
- Şenyayla, Muğla
- Taşlı, Muğla
- Yaraş, Muğla
- Yemişendere, Muğla
- Yenibağyaka, Muğla
- Yenice, Muğla
- Yeniköy, Muğla
- Yeniköy, Muğla
- Yerkesik, Muğla
- Yeşilyurt, Muğla
- Yörükoğlu, Muğla
- Zeytin, Muğla

== Bodrum ==
- Bodrum
- Akyarlar, Bodrum
- Bahçeyaka, Bodrum
- Bitez, Bodrum
- Çamarası, Bodrum
- Çamlık, Bodrum
- Çömlekçi, Bodrum
- Dağbelen, Bodrum
- Dereköy, Bodrum
- Gökpınar, Bodrum
- Göltürkbükü, Bodrum
- Gümüşlük, Bodrum
- Gündoğan, Bodrum
- Gürece, Bodrum
- Güvercinlik, Bodrum
- İslamhaneleri, Bodrum
- Kemer, Bodrum
- Konacık, Bodrum
- Kumköy, Bodrum
- Mazıköy, Bodrum
- Mumcular, Bodrum
- Ortakentyahşi, Bodrum
- Peksimet, Bodrum
- Pınarlıbelen, Bodrum
- Sazköy, Bodrum
- Tepecik, Bodrum
- Turgutreis, Bodrum
- Yakaköy, Bodrum
- Yalı, Bodrum
- Yalıkavak, Bodrum
- Yeniköy, Bodrum

== Dalaman ==
- Dalaman
- Bozbel, Dalaman
- Çöğmen, Dalaman
- Darıyeri, Dalaman
- Elcik, Dalaman
- Gürköy, Dalaman
- Gürleyk, Dalaman
- Kapukargın, Dalaman
- Karacaağaç, Dalaman
- Kargınkürü, Dalaman
- Kavacık, Dalaman
- Kayadibi, Dalaman
- Kızılkaya, Dalaman
- Narlı, Dalaman
- Sabunlu, Dalaman
- Şerefler, Dalaman
- Taşbaşı, Dalaman

== Datça ==
- Datça
- Cumalı, Datça
- Emecik, Datça
- Hızırşah, Datça
- Karaköy, Datça
- Kızlan, Datça
- Mesudiye, Datça
- Sındı, Datça
- Yaka, Datça
- Yazı, Datça

== Fethiye ==
- Fethiye
- Alaçat, Fethiye
- Arifler, Fethiye
- Arpacık, Fethiye
- Arsaköy, Fethiye
- Atlıdere, Fethiye
- Bağlıağaç, Fethiye
- Bayırköy, Fethiye
- Bekçiler, Fethiye
- Boğalar, Fethiye
- Boğaziçi, Fethiye
- Bozyer, Fethiye
- Ceylan, Fethiye
- Çaltılar, Fethiye
- Çaltıözü, Fethiye
- Çamköy, Fethiye
- Çamurköy, Fethiye
- Çatak, Fethiye
- Çayan, Fethiye
- Çaykenarı, Fethiye
- Çenger, Fethiye
- Çiftlik, Fethiye
- Çobanisa, Fethiye
- Çobanlar, Fethiye
- Çökek, Fethiye
- Çukurincir, Fethiye
- Demirler, Fethiye
- Dereköy, Fethiye
- Dodurga, Fethiye
- Doğanlar, Fethiye
- Döğer, Fethiye
- Eldirek, Fethiye
- Esenköy, Fethiye
- Eşen, Fethiye
- Fethiye, Fethiye
- Girmeler, Fethiye
- Göcek, Fethiye
- Gökben, Fethiye
- Gökçeovacık, Fethiye
- Gölbent, Fethiye
- Güneşli, Fethiye
- Hacıosmanlar, Fethiye
- İncirköy, Fethiye
- İnlice, Fethiye
- İzzettinköy, Fethiye
- Kabaağaç, Fethiye
- Kadıköy, Fethiye
- Karaağaç, Fethiye
- Karacaören, Fethiye
- Karaçulha, Fethiye
- Karadere, Fethiye
- Karaköy, Fethiye
- Kargı, Fethiye
- Kayabaşı, Fethiye
- Kayacık, Fethiye
- Kayadibi, Fethiye
- Kayaköy, Fethiye
- Keçiler, Fethiye
- Kemer, Fethiye
- Kıncılar, Fethiye
- Kınık, Fethiye
- Kızılbel, Fethiye
- Korubükü, Fethiye
- Koruköy, Fethiye
- Kumluova, Fethiye
- Minare, Fethiye
- Ortaköy, Fethiye
- Ölüdeniz, Fethiye
- Ören, Fethiye
- Paşalı, Fethiye
- Sahilceylan, Fethiye
- Sarıyer, Fethiye
- Seki, Fethiye
- Seydiler, Fethiye
- Söğütlü, Fethiye
- Söğütlüdere, Fethiye
- Temel, Fethiye
- Uğurlu, Fethiye
- Uzunyurt, Fethiye
- Yakabağ, Fethiye
- Yakacık, Fethiye
- Yakaköy, Fethiye
- Yanıklar, Fethiye
- Yaylapatlangıç, Fethiye
- Yeşilüzümlü, Fethiye
- Zorlar, Fethiye

== Kavaklıdere ==
- Kavaklıdere
- Çamlıbel, Kavaklıdere
- Çamlıyurt, Kavaklıdere
- Çavdır, Kavaklıdere
- Çayboyu, Kavaklıdere
- Derebağ, Kavaklıdere
- Kurucuova, Kavaklıdere
- Menteşe, Kavaklıdere
- Nebiler, Kavaklıdere
- Ortaköy, Kavaklıdere
- Salkım, Kavaklıdere
- Yeşilköy, Kavaklıdere

== Köyceğiz ==
- Köyceğiz
- Akköprü, Köyceğiz
- Balcılar, Köyceğiz
- Beyobası, Köyceğiz
- Çandır, Köyceğiz
- Çayhisar, Köyceğiz
- Döğüşbelen, Köyceğiz
- Ekincik, Köyceğiz
- Hamitköy, Köyceğiz
- Karaçam, Köyceğiz
- Kavakarası, Köyceğiz
- Köyceğiz, Köyceğiz
- Otmanlar, Köyceğiz
- Pınar, Köyceğiz
- Sazak, Köyceğiz
- Sultaniye, Köyceğiz
- Toparlar, Köyceğiz
- Yangı, Köyceğiz
- Yayla, Köyceğiz
- Yeşilköy, Köyceğiz
- Zaferler, Köyceğiz
- Zeytinalanı, Köyceğiz

== Marmaris ==
- Marmaris
- Adaköy, Marmaris
- Armutalan, Marmaris
- Bayır, Marmaris
- Beldibi, Marmaris
- Bozburun, Marmaris
- Çamlı, Marmaris
- Çetibeli, Marmaris
- Hisarönü, Marmaris
- İçmeler, Marmaris
- Karaca, Marmaris
- Orhaniye, Marmaris
- Osmaniye, Marmaris
- Selimiye, Marmaris
- Söğüt, Marmaris
- Taşlıca, Marmaris
- Turgut, Marmaris
- Turunç, Marmaris
- Yeşilbelde, Marmaris

== Milas ==
- Milas
- Ağaçlıhüyük, Milas
- Akçakaya, Milas
- Akçalı, Milas
- Akkovanlık, Milas
- Akyol, Milas
- Alaçam, Milas
- Alatepe, Milas
- Aslanyaka, Milas
- Avşar, Milas
- Bafa, Milas
- Bağdamları, Milas
- Baharlı, Milas
- Bahçe, Milas
- Bahçeburun, Milas
- Balcılar, Milas
- Bayır, Milas
- Beçin, Milas
- Beyciler, Milas
- Boğaziçi, Milas
- Bozalan, Milas
- Bozbük, Milas
- Çakıralan, Milas
- Çallı, Milas
- Çamköy, Milas
- Çamlıbelen, Milas
- Çamlıca, Milas
- Çamlıyurt, Milas
- Çamovalı, Milas
- Çandır, Milas
- Çınarlı, Milas
- Çiftlik, Milas
- Çomakdağkızılağaç, Milas
- Çökertme, Milas
- Çukur, Milas
- Damlıboğaz, Milas
- Danişment, Milas
- Demirciler, Milas
- Dere, Milas
- Derince, Milas
- Dibekdere, Milas
- Dörttepe, Milas
- Eğridere, Milas
- Ekinanbarı, Milas
- Ekindere, Milas
- Ekizköy, Milas
- Ekiztaş, Milas
- Epçe, Milas
- Etrenli, Milas
- Fesleğen, Milas
- Gökbel, Milas
- Gökçeler, Milas
- Göldere, Milas
- Gölyaka, Milas
- Güllük, Milas
- Günlük, Milas
- Gürceğiz, Milas
- Gürçamlar, Milas
- Hacıahmetler, Milas
- Hasanlar, Milas
- Hisarcık, Milas
- Hüsamlar, Milas
- İçme, Milas
- Kafaca, Milas
- Kalem, Milas
- Kalınağıl, Milas
- Kandak, Milas
- Kapıkırı, Milas
- Karacaağaç, Milas
- Karacahisar, Milas
- Karahayıt, Milas
- Karakuyu, Milas
- Karapınar, Milas
- Kargıcak, Milas
- Karşıyaka, Milas
- Kayabaşı, Milas
- Kayabükü, Milas
- Kayadere, Milas
- Kazıklı, Milas
- Kemikler, Milas
- Ketendere, Milas
- Kılavuz, Milas
- Kırcağız, Milas
- Kısırlar, Milas
- Kıyıkışlacık, Milas
- Kızılağaç, Milas
- Kızılcakuyu, Milas
- Kızılcayıkık, Milas
- Konak, Milas
- Koru, Milas
- Korucuk, Milas
- Köşk, Milas
- Kultak, Milas
- Kurudere, Milas
- Kuzyaka, Milas
- Küçükdibekdere, Milas
- Menteş, Milas
- Meşelik, Milas
- Narhisar, Milas
- Olukbaşı, Milas
- Ortaköy, Milas
- Ovakışlacık, Milas
- Ören, Milas
- Pınararası, Milas
- Pınarcık, Milas
- Pinar, Milas
- Sakarkaya, Milas
- Sarıkaya, Milas
- Savran, Milas
- Sek, Milas
- Selimiye, Milas
- Söğütçük, Milas
- Şenköy, Milas
- Tuzabat, Milas
- Türkevleri, Milas
- Ulaş, Milas
- Yaka, Milas
- Yaşyer, Milas
- Yoğunoluk, Milas
- Yusufca, Milas

== Ortaca ==
- Ortaca
- Akıncı, Ortaca
- Dalyan, Ortaca
- Dereköy, Ortaca
- Eskiköy, Ortaca
- Fevziye, Ortaca
- Gökbel, Ortaca
- Gölbaşı, Ortaca
- Güzelyurt, Ortaca
- Karadonlar, Ortaca
- Kemaliye, Ortaca
- Mergenli, Ortaca
- Okçular, Ortaca
- Sarıgerme, Ortaca
- Tepearası, Ortaca
- Yeşilyurt, Ortaca

== Ula ==
- Ula
- Akçapınar, Ula
- Akyaka, Ula
- Arıcılar, Ula
- Armutcuk, Ula
- Ataköy, Ula
- Çıtlık, Ula
- Çiçekli, Ula
- Çörüş, Ula
- Elmalı, Ula
- Esentepe, Ula
- Gökçe, Ula
- Gökova, Ula
- Gölcük, Ula
- Karabörtlen, Ula
- Kavakçalı, Ula
- Kıra, Ula
- Kızılağaç, Ula
- Kızılyaka, Ula
- Örnekköy, Ula
- Portakallık, Ula
- Sarayyanı, Ula
- Şirinköy, Ula
- Turgut, Ula
- Yaylasöğüt, Ula
- Yeşilçam, Ula
- Yeşilova, Ula

== Yatağan ==
- Yatağan
- Akgedik, Yatağan
- Alaşar, Yatağan
- Bağyaka, Yatağan
- Bahçeyaka, Yatağan
- Bencik, Yatağan
- Bozarmut, Yatağan
- Bozüyük, Yatağan
- Cazkırlar, Yatağan
- Çakırlar, Yatağan
- Çamlıca, Yatağan
- Çukuröz, Yatağan
- Deştin, Yatağan
- Doğanköy, Yatağan
- Elmacık, Yatağan
- Esenköy, Yatağan
- Eskihisar, Yatağan
- Gökgedik, Yatağan
- Gökpınar, Yatağan
- Hacıbayramlar, Yatağan
- Hacıveliler, Yatağan
- Hisarardı, Yatağan
- Kadıköy, Yatağan
- Kafacakaplancık, Yatağan
- Kapubağ, Yatağan
- Katrancı, Yatağan
- Kavakköy, Yatağan
- Kırıkköy, Yatağan
- Kozağaç, Yatağan
- Köklük, Yatağan
- Madenler, Yatağan
- Mesken, Yatağan
- Nebiköy, Yatağan
- Şahinler, Yatağan
- Şerefköy, Yatağan
- Turgut, Yatağan
- Turgutlar, Yatağan
- Yava, Yatağan
- Yayla, Yatağan
- Yenikarakuyu, Yatağan
- Yeniköy, Yatağan
- Yeşilbağcılar, Yatağan
- Yeşilköy, Yatağan
- Yukarıyayla, Yatağan
- Zeytin, Yatağan

== Recent development ==
According to Law act no 6360, all Turkish provinces with a population more than 750 000, were renamed as metropolitan municipality. Furthermore, a new district was established; Seydikemer. All districts in those provinces became second level municipalities and all villages in those districts were renamed as a neighborhoods . Thus the villages listed above are officially neighborhoods of Muğla.
