= Murat Karagöz =

Turkish diplomat (1967–2023)

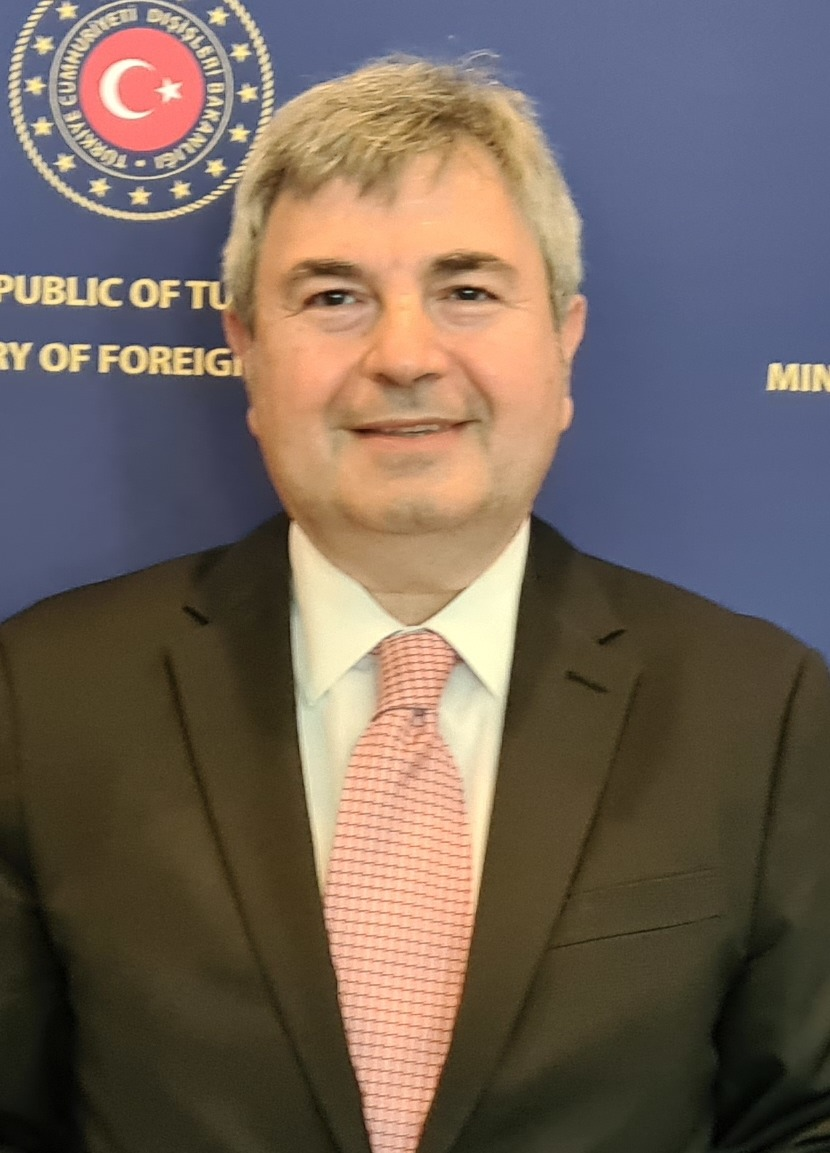

Ambassador of Turkey to Portugal
- In office 15 March 2023 – 30 June 2023

Ambassador of Turkey to Mongolia
- In office 2013–2016

Ambassador of Turkey to Jordan
- In office 2016–2019

Personal details
- Born: 14 August 1967 Istanbul, Turkey
- Died: 30 June 2023 (aged 55) Fethiye, Muğla, Turkey
- Children: 1
- Education: Istanbul Boys' High School; Istanbul University; CUNY Graduate Center
- Profession: Diplomat

Murat Karagöz (14 August 1967 – 30 June 2023) was a Turkish diplomat. He served as Turkish ambassador in both Mongolia and Jordan. He was until his death, the Turkish ambassador to Lisbon, Portugal (a position he resumed on 15 March 2023). He served as director of information and communications and held various positions within the Ministry of Foreign Affairs of Turkey.

== Early life and education ==
Karagöz, born in Istanbul on 14 August 1967. He was a student at the Istanbul Boys High School, leaving in 1985 before completing a first degree at University of Istanbul, Faculty of Economics, Department of International Relations in 1989. In 2007, He obtained his master's degree (Political Science) in the United States from the Graduate School and University Center of the City University of New York.

== Diplomatic career ==
Timeline	Office	Host country
1989–1990	Personnel Department staff (career candidate)	Turkey
1990–1991	Attaché in the Department of Eastern Europe and Asia	Turkey
1991–1992	Attaché in the Department of Economic Affairs with East European Countries	Turkey
1992–1995	Attaché and Third Secretary in the Embassy of Turkey in Sofia	Bulgaria
1995–1997	Third Secretary and Second Secretary in the Permanent Mission of Turkey to the NATO	Belgium
1998–2000	Advisor for Foreign Affairs to the Presidency of the Republic of Turkey	Turkey
2000–2004	First Secretary and Counsellor in the Permanent Mission of Türkiye to the UN	USA
2004–2006	Private Advisor to the Undersecretary	Turkey
2006–2009	First Counsellor in the Embassy of Türkiye in Washington D.C	USA
2009–2013	Deputy Director General for the Balkans and Central Europe	Turkey
2013–2016	Ambassador to Mongolia	Mongolia
2016–2019	Ambassador to Jordan	Jordan
2020 – March 2023	Director General for Information and Communications, Ministry of Foreign Affairs	Turkey
March 2023 – June 2023	Ambassador to Portugal	Portugal

== Death ==
On 30 June 2023, Karagöz died while swimming in the Faralya neighbourhood of Fethiye, Muğla near Ölüdeniz. He was pronounced dead after arriving at a Fethiye hospital via ambulance. The cause of death was determined as cardiac arrest. He was 55 at the time and he was survived by one child.

Incumbent foreign minister Hakan Fidan and his predecessor Mevlüt Çavuşoğlu joined a host of Turkish and European diplomats to express their condolences for Karagöz.
