= Akarca, Fethiye =

Village in Turkey

Akarca
- Neighbourhood
- Location in Turkey Akarca (Turkey Aegean)
- Coordinates: 36°39′11″N 29°7′19″E
- Country: Turkey
- Province: Muğla
- District: Fethiye
- Population (2024): 7,201
- Time zone: UTC+3 (TRT)

Akarca is a neighbourhood in the municipality and district of Fethiye, Muğla Province, Turkey. Its population is 7,201 (2024).
