= Taşyaka, Fethiye =

Village in Turkey

Taşyaka
- Neighbourhood
- Coordinates
- Country: Turkey
- Province: Muğla
- District: Fethiye
- Population (2024): 13,285
- Time zone: UTC+3 (TRT)

Taşyaka is a neighbourhood in the municipality and district of Fethiye, Muğla Province, Turkey. Its population is 13,285 (2024).
