= Karakeçililer, Fethiye =

Village in Turkey

Karakeçililer
- Neighbourhood
- Country: Turkey
- Province: Muğla
- District: Fethiye
- Population (2024): 288
- Time zone: UTC+3 (TRT)

Karakeçililer is a neighbourhood in the municipality and district of Fethiye, Muğla Province, Turkey. Its population is 288 (2024).
