= Cami, Fethiye =

Village in Turkey

Cami
- Neighbourhood
- Coordinates
- Country: Turkey
- Province: Muğla
- District: Fethiye
- Population (2024): 3,228
- Time zone: UTC+3 (TRT)

Cami is a neighbourhood in the municipality and district of Fethiye, Muğla Province, Turkey. Its population is 3,228 (2024).
