= Foça, Fethiye =

Village in Turkey

Foça
- Neighbourhood
- Location in Turkey Foça (Turkey Aegean)
- Coordinates: 36.6613°N 29.1224°E
- Country: Turkey
- Province: Muğla
- District: Fethiye
- Population (2024): 10,805
- Time zone: UTC+3 (TRT)

Foça is a neighbourhood in the municipality and district of Fethiye, Muğla Province, Turkey. Its population is 10,805 (2024).
