= Çatalarık, Fethiye =

Village in Turkey

Çatalarık
- Neighbourhood
- Coordinates
- Country: Turkey
- Province: Muğla
- District: Fethiye
- Population (2024): 4,593
- Time zone: UTC+3 (TRT)

Çatalarık is a neighbourhood in the municipality and district of Fethiye, Muğla Province, Turkey. Its population is 4,593 (2024).
