= Cumhuriyet, Fethiye =

Village in Turkey

Cumhuriyet
- Neighbourhood
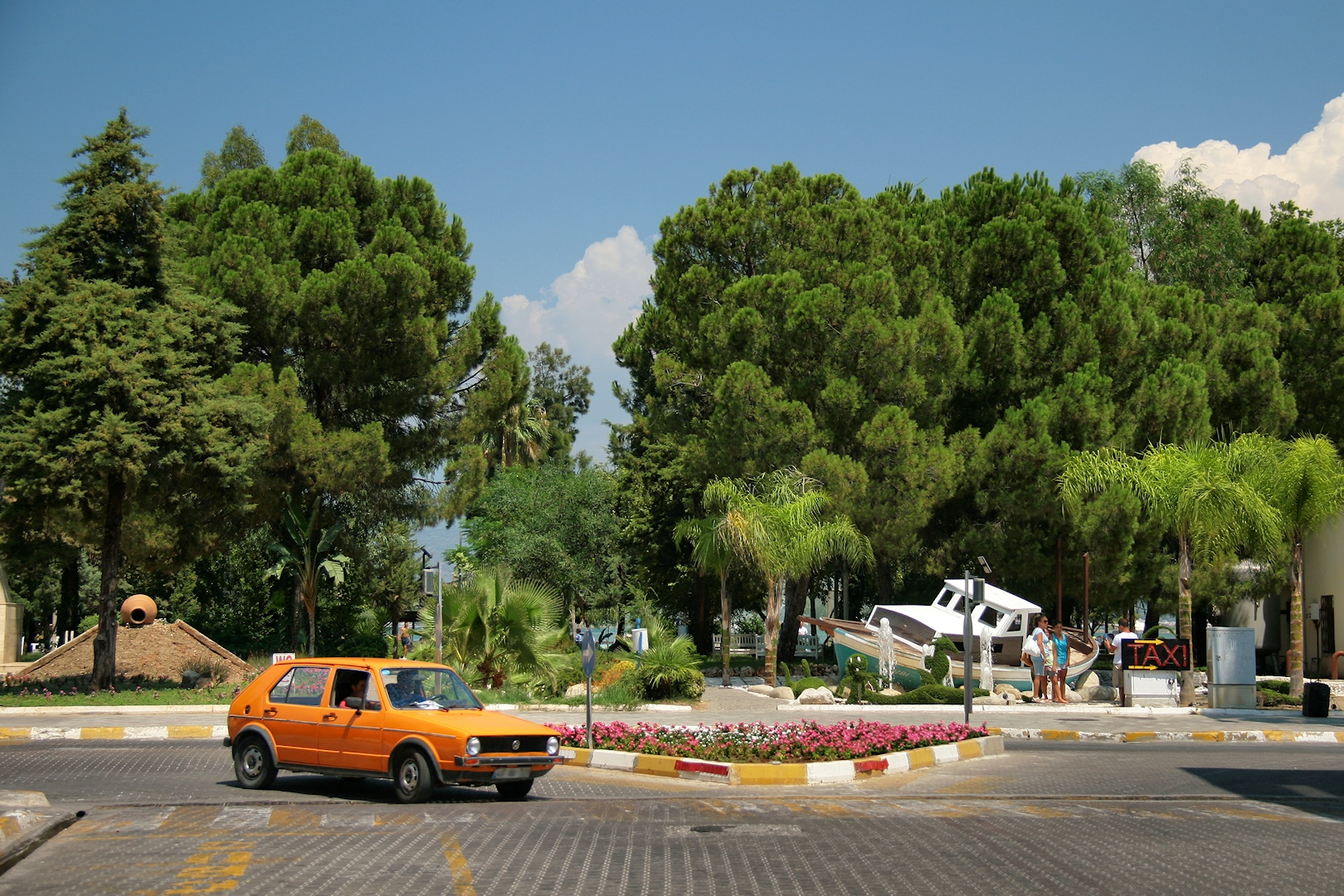

- Location within Turkey Location within Turkey Aegean
- Country: Turkey
- Province: Muğla
- District: Fethiye
- Population (2024): 2,613
- Time zone: UTC+3 (TRT)

Cumhuriyet is a neighbourhood in the municipality and district of Fethiye, Muğla Province, Turkey. Its population is 2,613 (2024).
