= Menteşeoğlu, Fethiye =

Village in Turkey

Menteşeoğlu
- Neighbourhood
- Coordinates
- Country: Turkey
- Province: Muğla
- District: Fethiye
- Population (2024): 6,896
- Time zone: UTC+3 (TRT)

Menteşeoğlu is a neighbourhood in the municipality and district of Fethiye, Muğla Province, Turkey. Its population is 6,896 (2024).
