= Tomb of Amyntas =

Mountainside tomb in Fethiye, Aegean Turkey

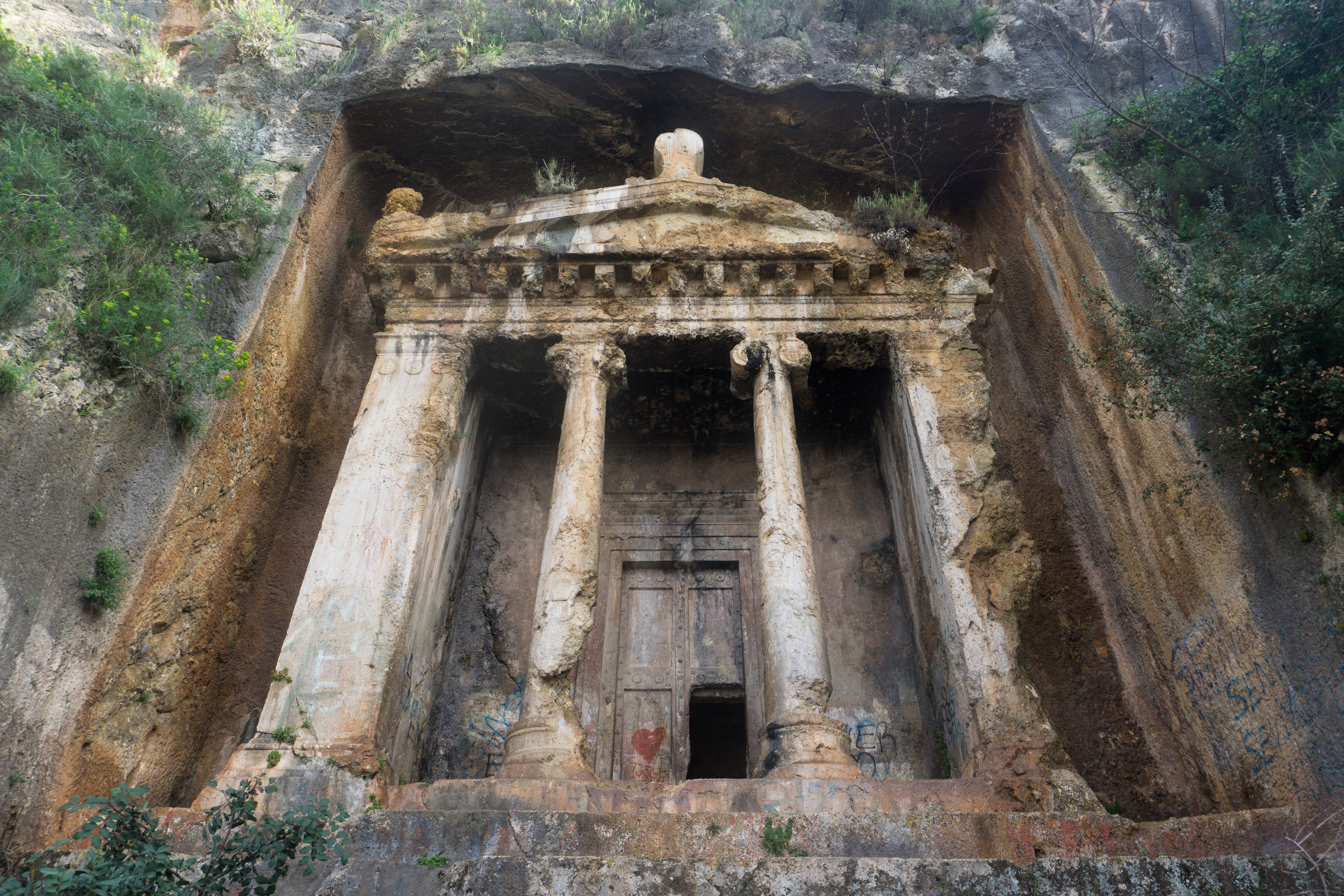
- The tomb of Amyntas in Fethiye

- Location within Turkey
- 36°37′6″N 29°7′4″E
- Type: Ancient tomb
- Location: Muğla Province, Turkey
- Region: Fethiye

The Tomb of Amyntas, also known as the Fethiye Tomb, is an ancient Lycian rock-hewn tomb at ancient Telmessos, in Lycia, which was at the time a satrapy of the Achaemenid Empire. Currently, it is in the district of Fethiye in Muğla Province, located in the Aegean region of Turkey.

== History ==
Modern Fethiye is located on the site of the Ancient Roman, then Hellenoroman, city of Telmessos, with the Tomb of Amyntas located in the south side of the city in the mountainside, in the base of the mountain. The impressive looking tomb was built in 350 BCE, and was named after the Greek inscription on the side of it which reads "Amyntou tou Ermagiou", which translated to English means "Amyntas, son of Hermagios".

The tomb was built by the Lycians, the people who lived in this satrapy of the Persian Empire at the time. The Lycians were a tightly knit confederation of independent city-states, including Telmessos.

Do not mistake the name Amyntas for the Macedonian king Amyntas I of Macedon, satrap of Skudra, and Ancestor of Alexander the Great. Amyntas in this context might be the descendant of the King maker of Cyrus the Great, the Median General Harpagos, who became satrap of Lycia, the first of the Harpagid Dynasty, for his services to Cyrus in his conquest.

== Features ==
Compared to many other tombs carved into mountainsides in the area, the interior of the Tomb of Amyntas is very spacious.

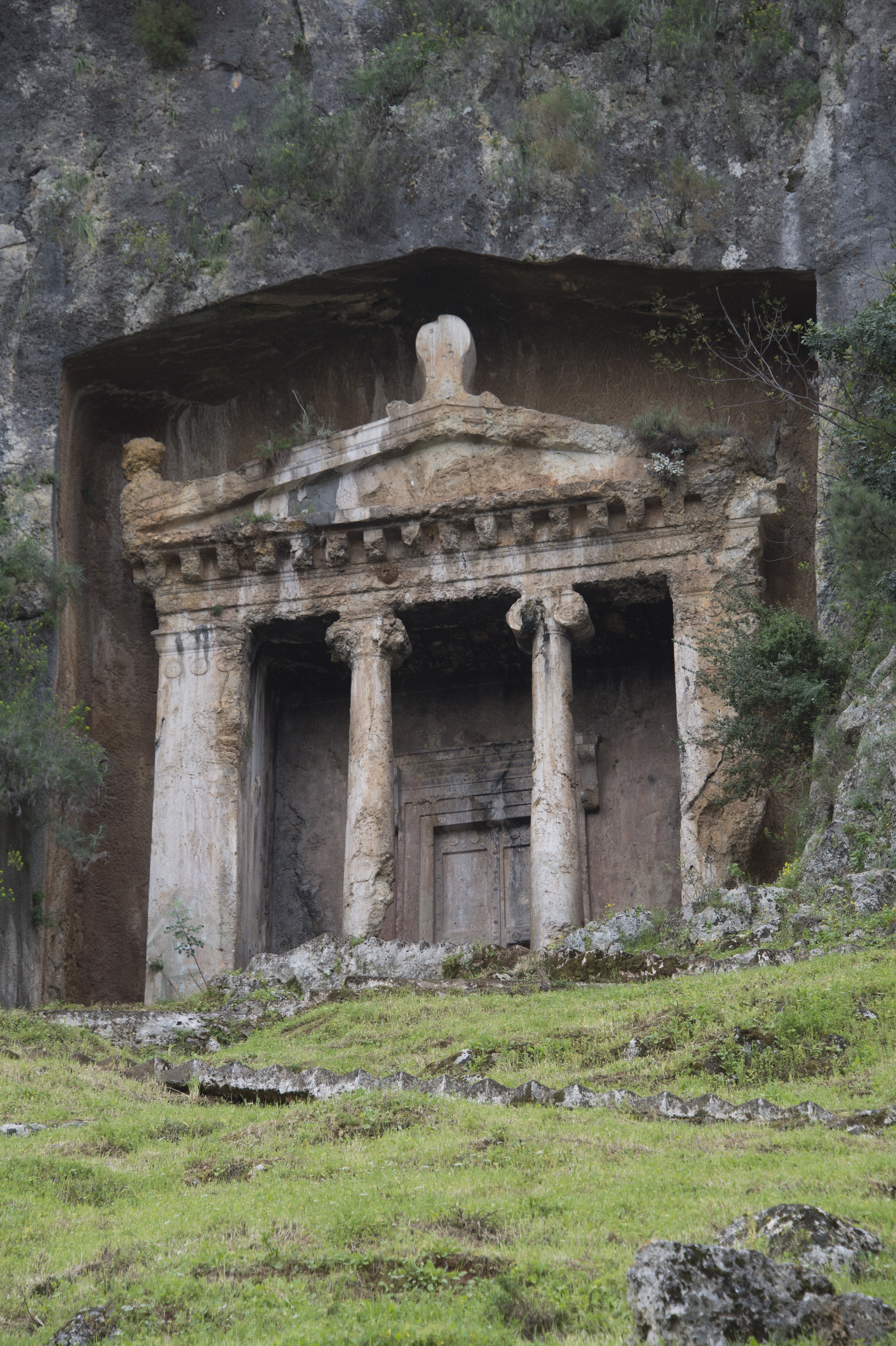
Fethiye Rock graves Amyntas tomb

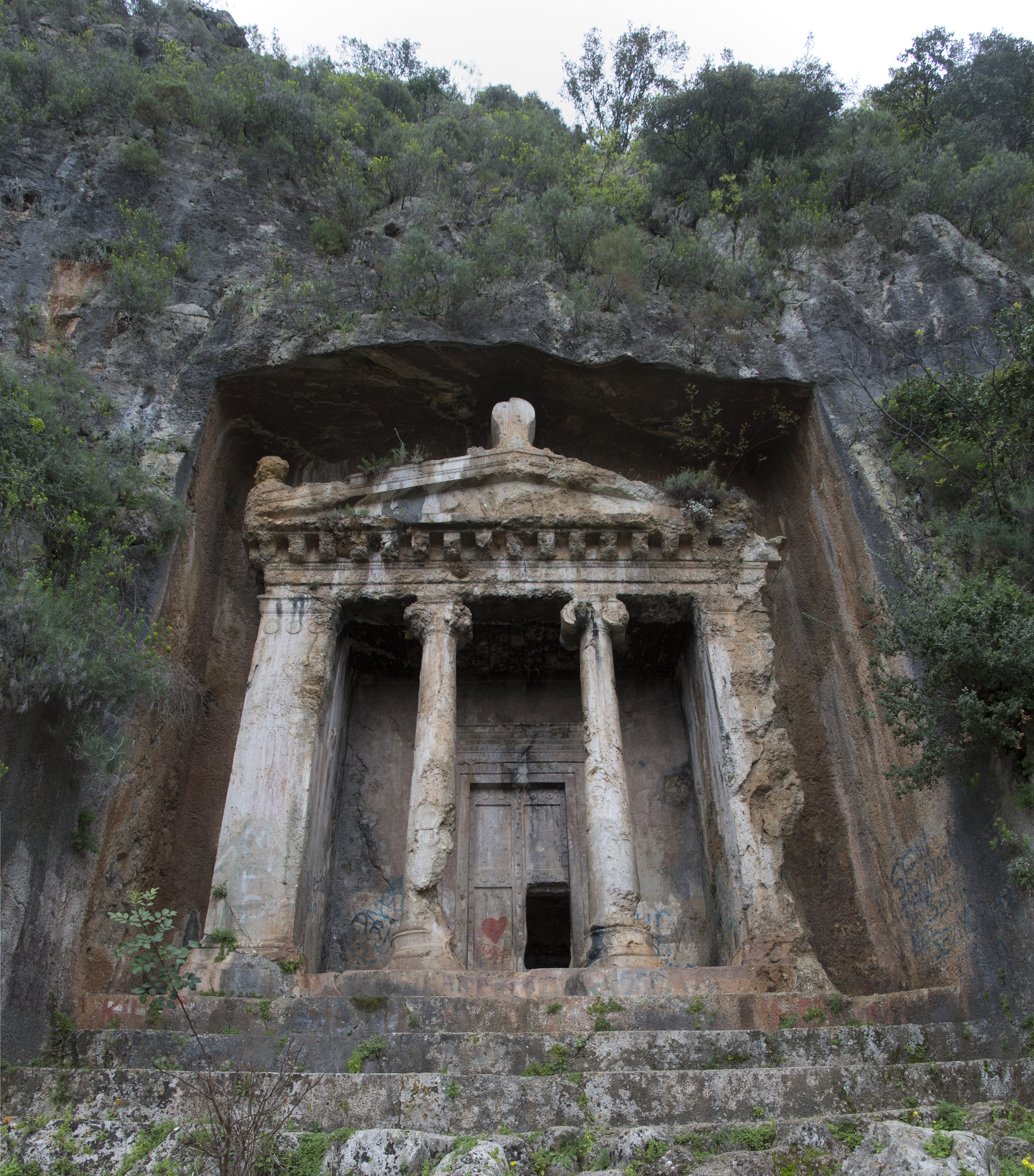
Fethiye Rock graves Amyntas tomb

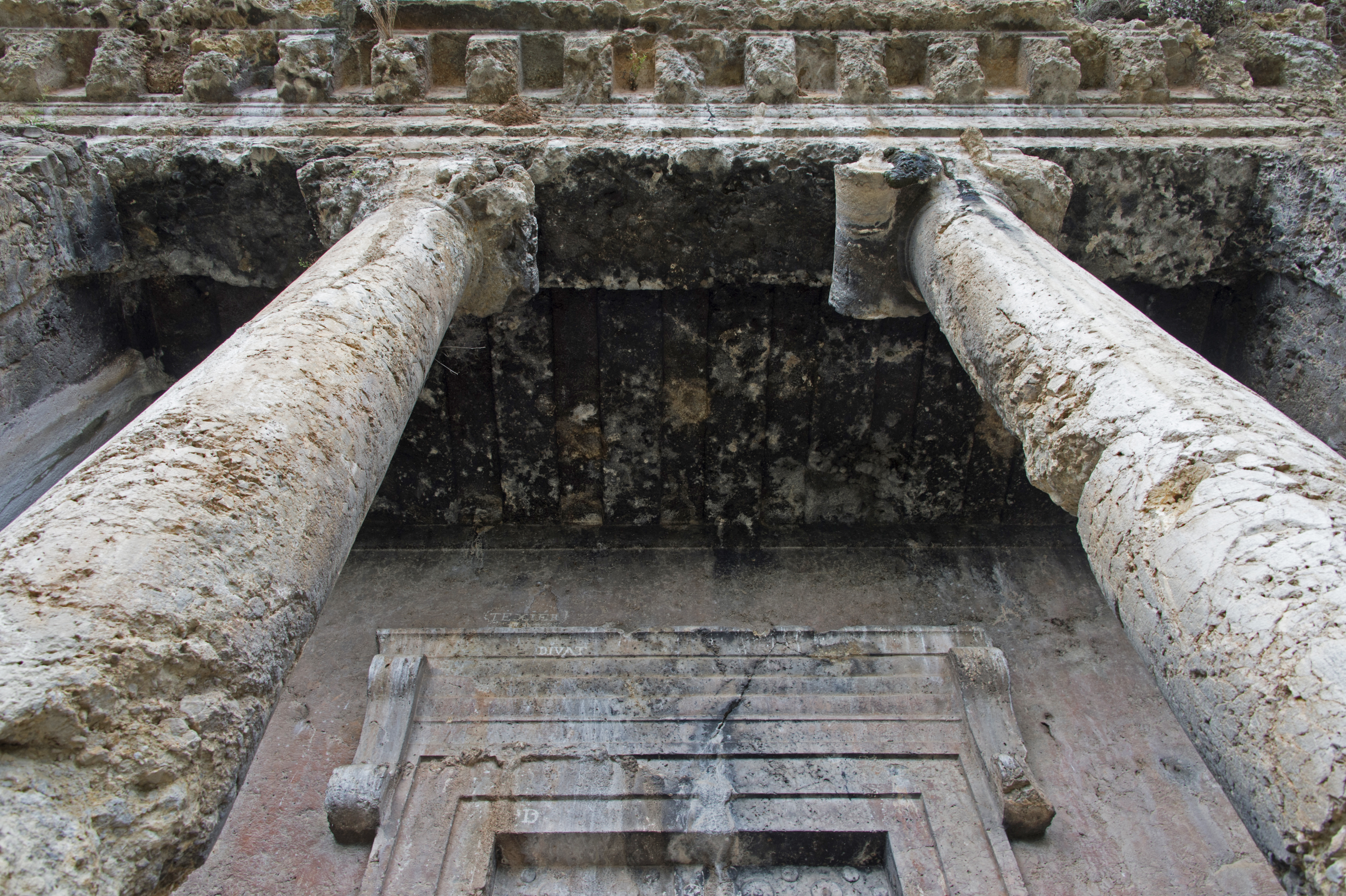
Fethiye Rock graves Amyntas tomb

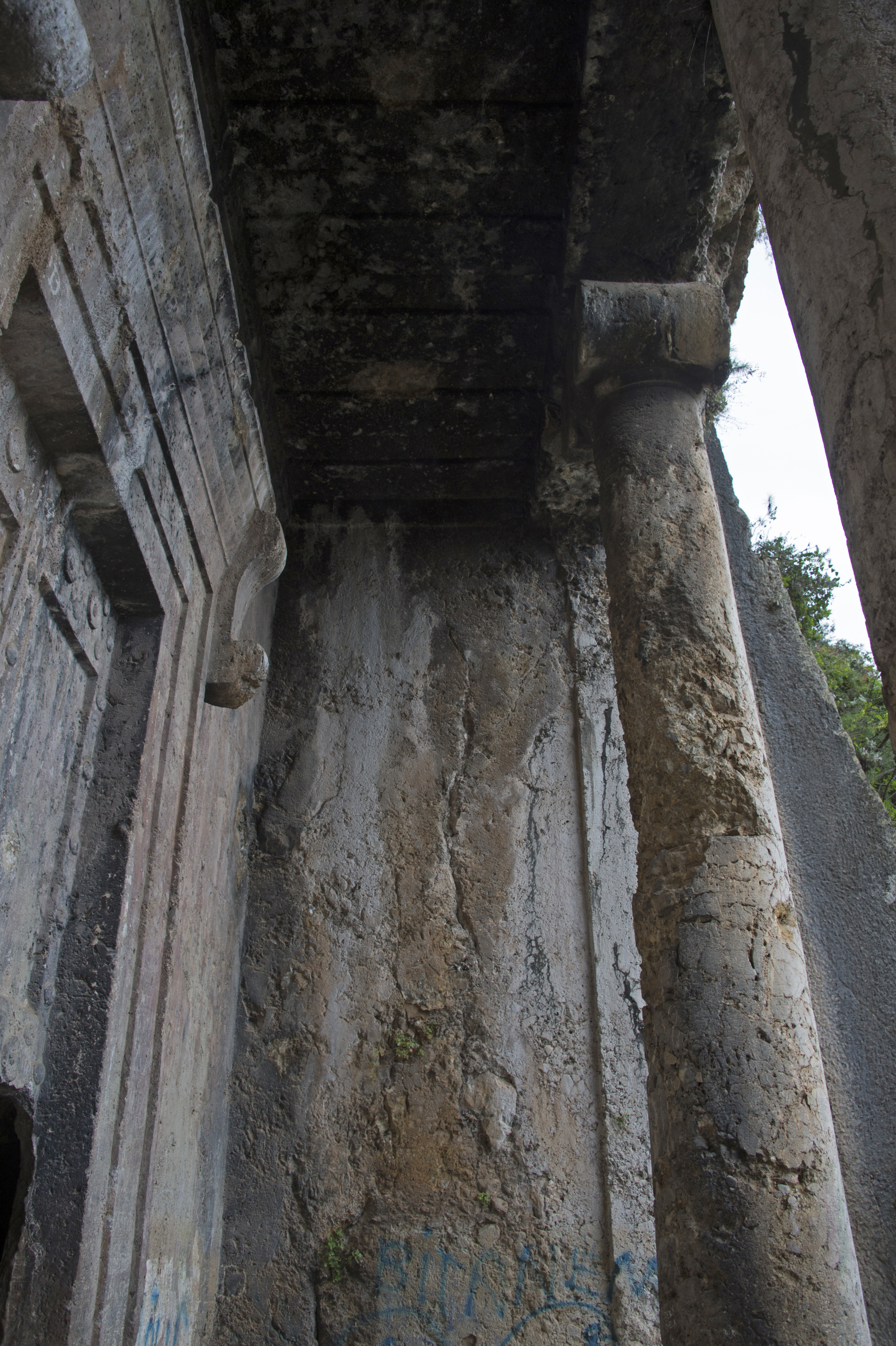
Fethiye Rock graves Amyntas tomb

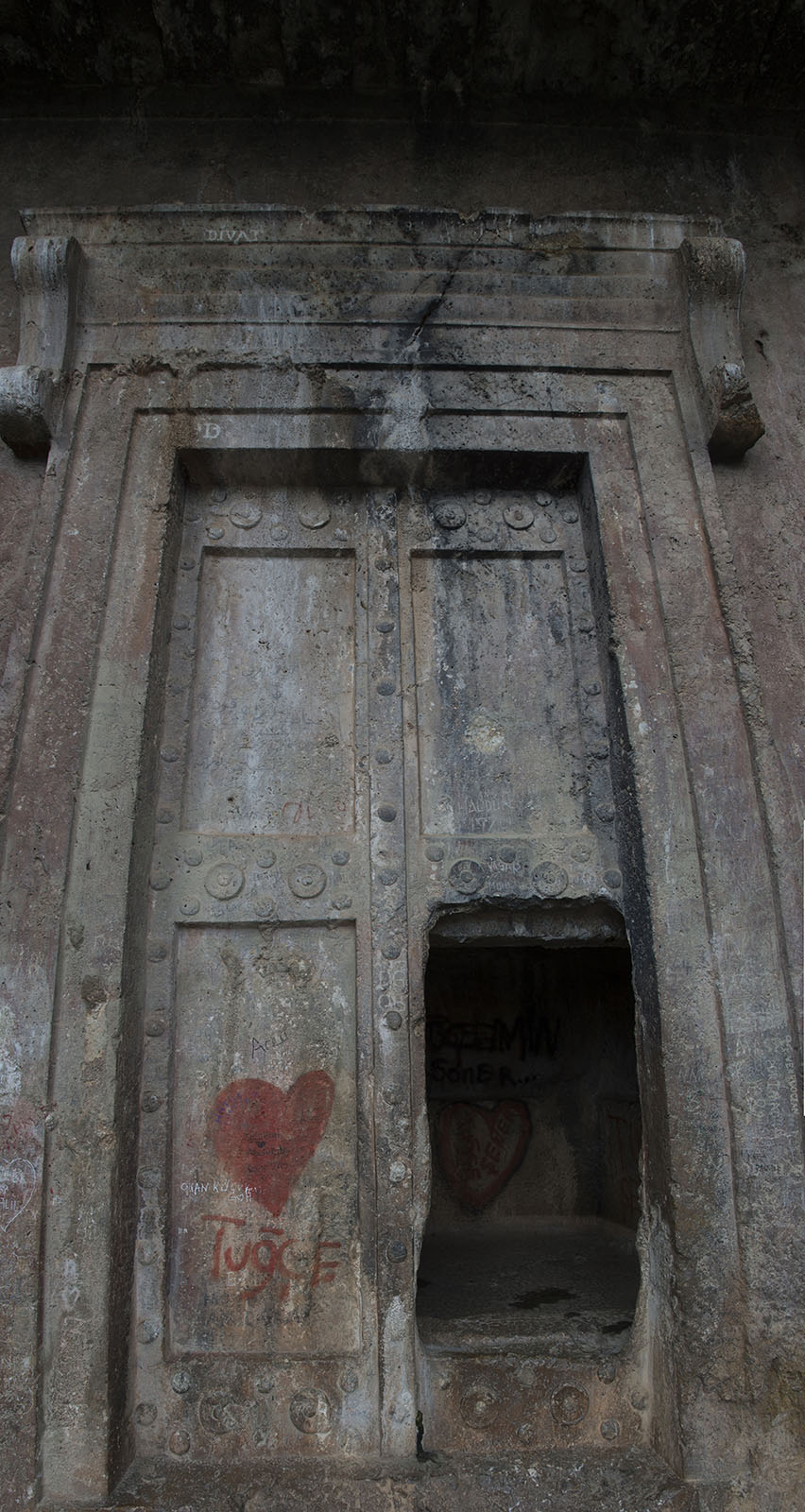
Fethiye Rock graves Tomb of Amyntas door

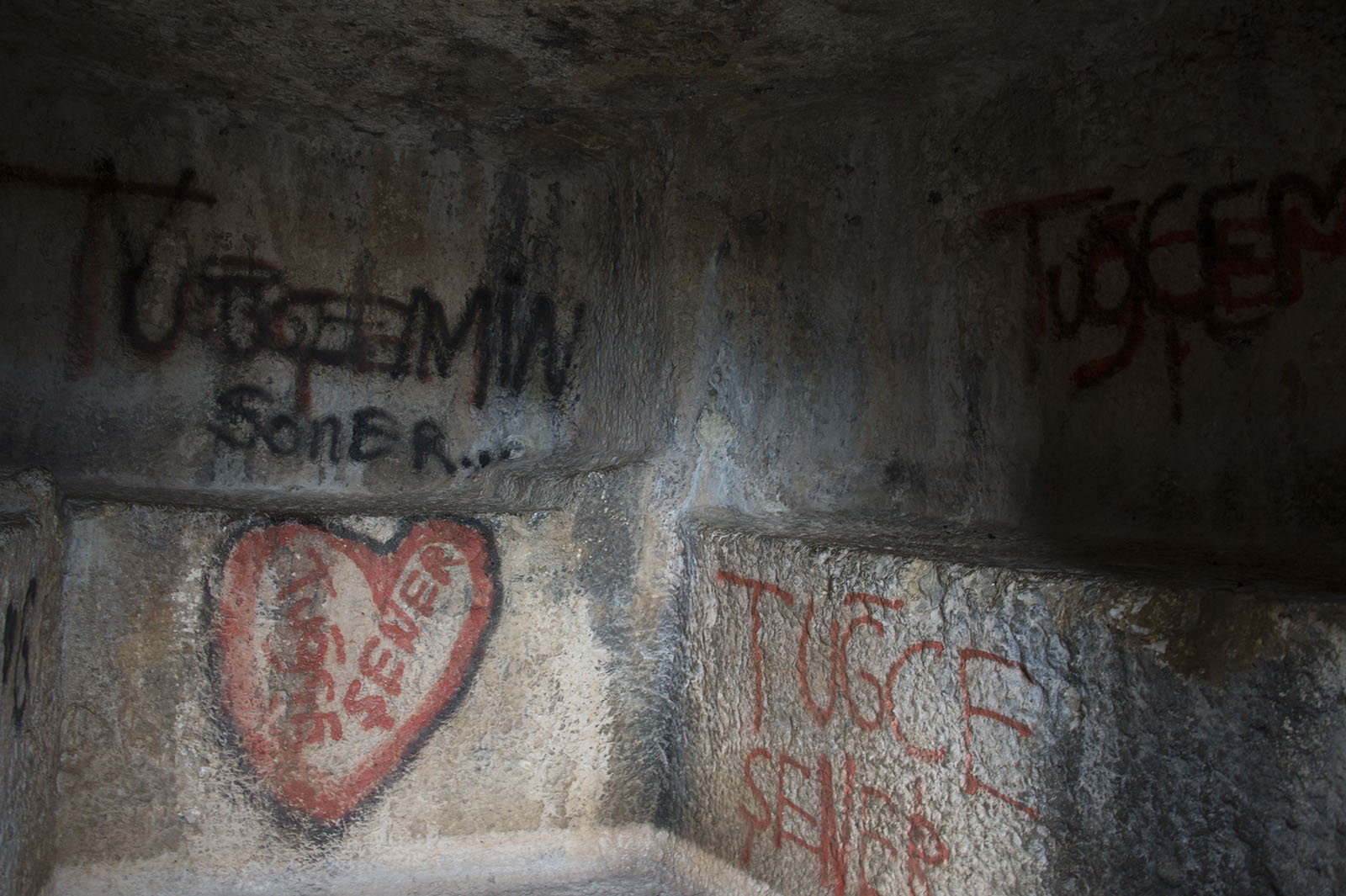
Fethiye Rock graves Tomb of Amyntas interior
