= Esenköy, Fethiye =

Village in Turkey

Esenköy
- Village
- Location in Turkey
- Country: Turkey
- Province: Muğla Province
- District: Fethiye

Population (2022)
  - Total: 6,407
- Time zone: UTC+3
  - Summer (DST): UTC+3 (EEST)

Esenköy is a neighbourhood in the municipality and district of Fethiye, Muğla Province, Turkey. Its population was 6,407 in 2022.
