= Karaçulha =

- Neighbourhood
- Location in Turkey Karaçulha (Turkey Aegean)
- Coordinates: 36°39′N 29°13′E
- Country: Turkey
- Province: Muğla
- District: Fethiye
- Elevation: 145 m (476 ft)
- Population (2022): 16,662
- Time zone: UTC+3 (TRT)
- Postal code: 48300
- Area code: 0252

Karaçulha is a neighbourhood of the municipality and district of Fethiye, Muğla Province, Turkey. Its population is 16,662 (2022). Before the 2013 reorganisation, it was a town (belde). It has almost merged to Fethiye proper. The distance to Muğla is 140 kilometres (87 mi). There are ancient ruins around Karaçulha. But the settlement was founded by Yörüks (nomadic Turkmens). Evliya Çelebi a 17th-century Turkish traveller mentions Karaçulha people in his book. The settlement was declared a seat of township in 1970.
