= İnlice, Fethiye =

İnlice
- Neighbourhood
- Location in Turkey İnlice (Turkey Aegean)
- Coordinates: 36°44′46″N 28°59′35″E
- Country: Turkey
- Province: Muğla
- District: Fethiye
- Population (2022): 1,433
- Time zone: UTC+3 (TRT)

İnlice is a neighbourhood of the municipality and district of Fethiye, Muğla Province, Turkey. Its population is 1,433 (2022). İnlice is now a part of the village of Göcek, on the road to Fethiye.
