= Fethiye =

District of Muğla Province, Turkey

- District and municipality
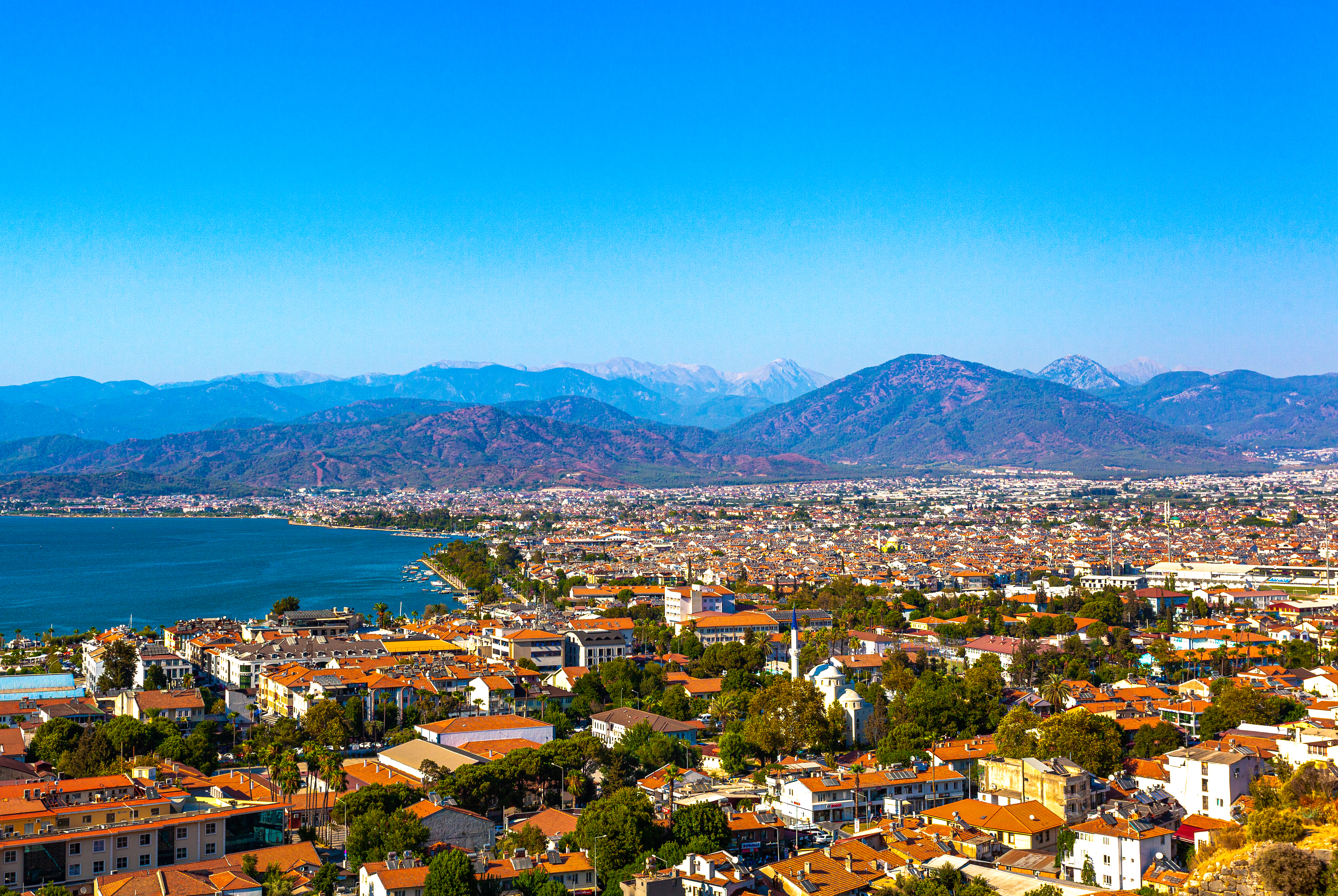

- Logo

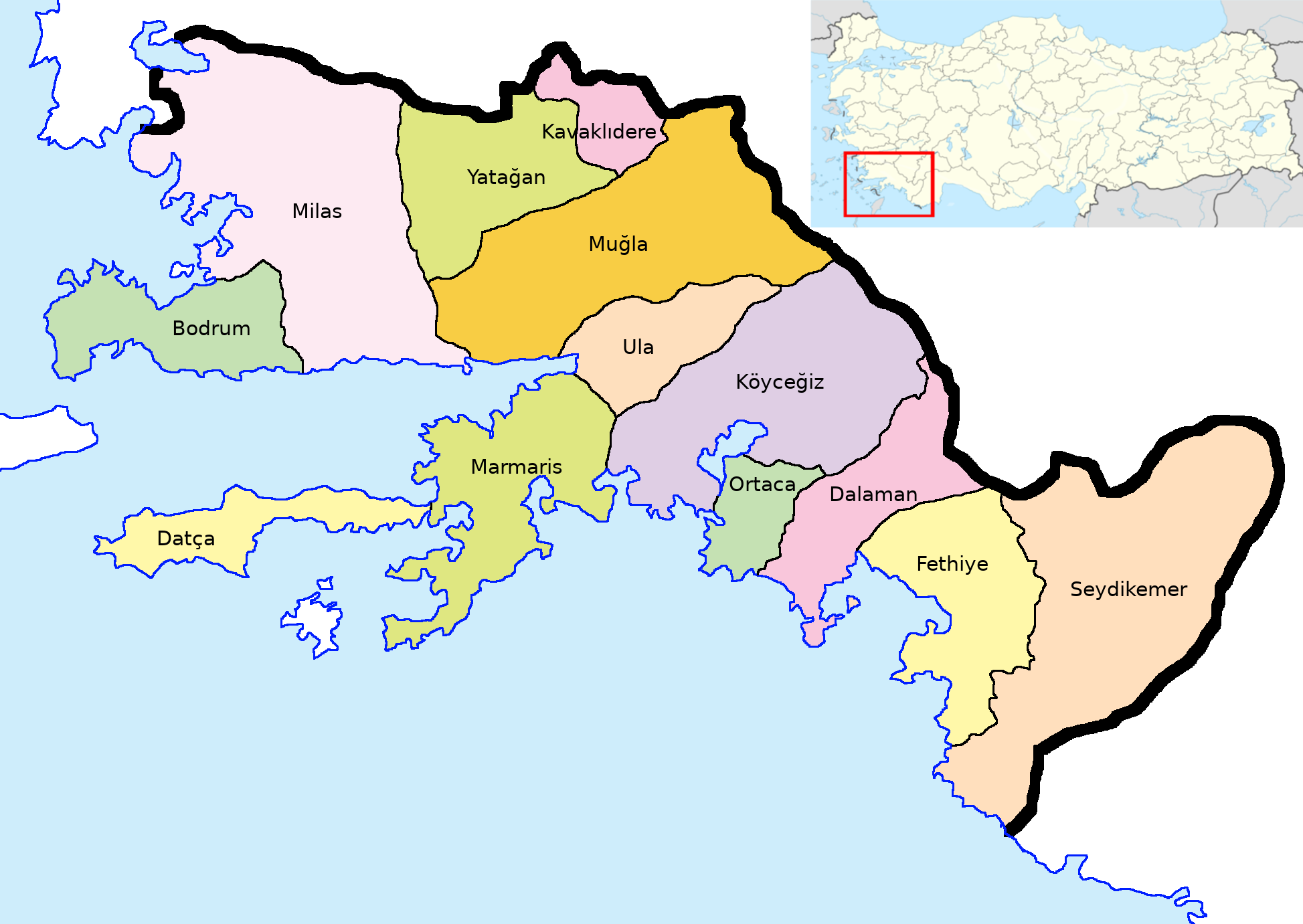
- Map showing Fethiye District in Muğla Province

- Location within Turkey Location within Turkey Aegean
- Coordinates: 36°39′5″N 29°7′23″E
- Country: Turkey
- Province: Muğla

Government
  - Mayor: Alim Karaca (CHP)
- Area: 875 km^{2} (338 sq mi)
- Population (2022): 177,702
  - Density: 203/km^{2} (526/sq mi)
- Time zone: UTC+3 (TRT)
- Postal code: 48300
- Area code: 0252
- Website: www.fethiye.bel.tr

Fethiye (Turkish pronunciation: [ˈfethije]) is a municipality and district of Muğla Province, Turkey. Its area is 875 km^{2}, and its population is 177,702 (2022). It is one of the prominent tourist destinations in the Turkish Riviera. It was formerly known as Makri, and Meğri.

== History ==
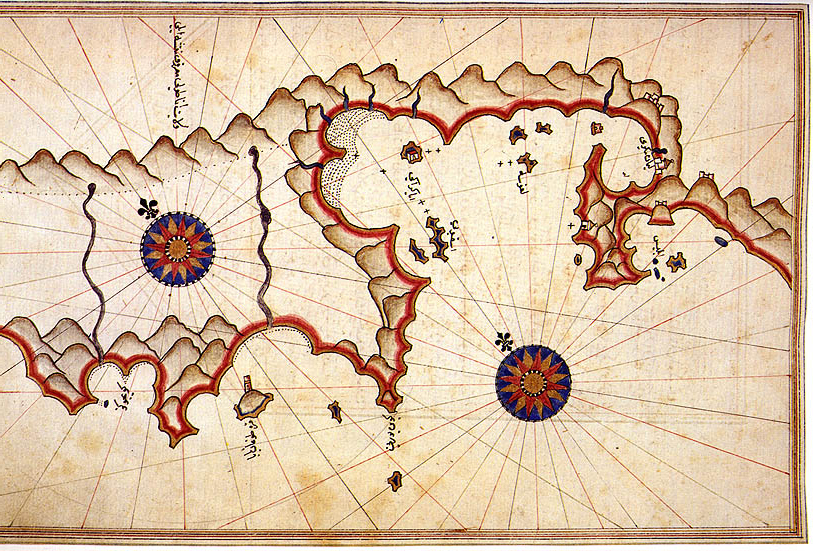
Historic map of Fethiye by Piri Reis

Fethiye was formerly known as Makri (Greek: Μάκρη), or Macri. Modern Fethiye is located on the site of the ancient city of Telmessos, the ruins of which can be seen in the city, e.g. the Hellenistic theatre by the main quay.

A Lycian legend explains the source of the name Telmessos as follows: The god Apollo falls in love with the youngest daughter of the King of Phoenicia, Agenor. He disguises himself as a small dog and thus, gains the love of the shy, withdrawn daughter. After he reappears as a handsome man, they have a son, whom they name 'Telmessos' (the land of lights).

The city became part of the Persian Empire after the invasion of the Persian general Harpagos in 547 BC, along with other Lycian and Carian cities. Telmessos then joined the Attic-Delos Union (Delian League) established in mid-5th century BC. and, although it later left the union and became an independent city, it continued its relations with the union until the 4th century BC.

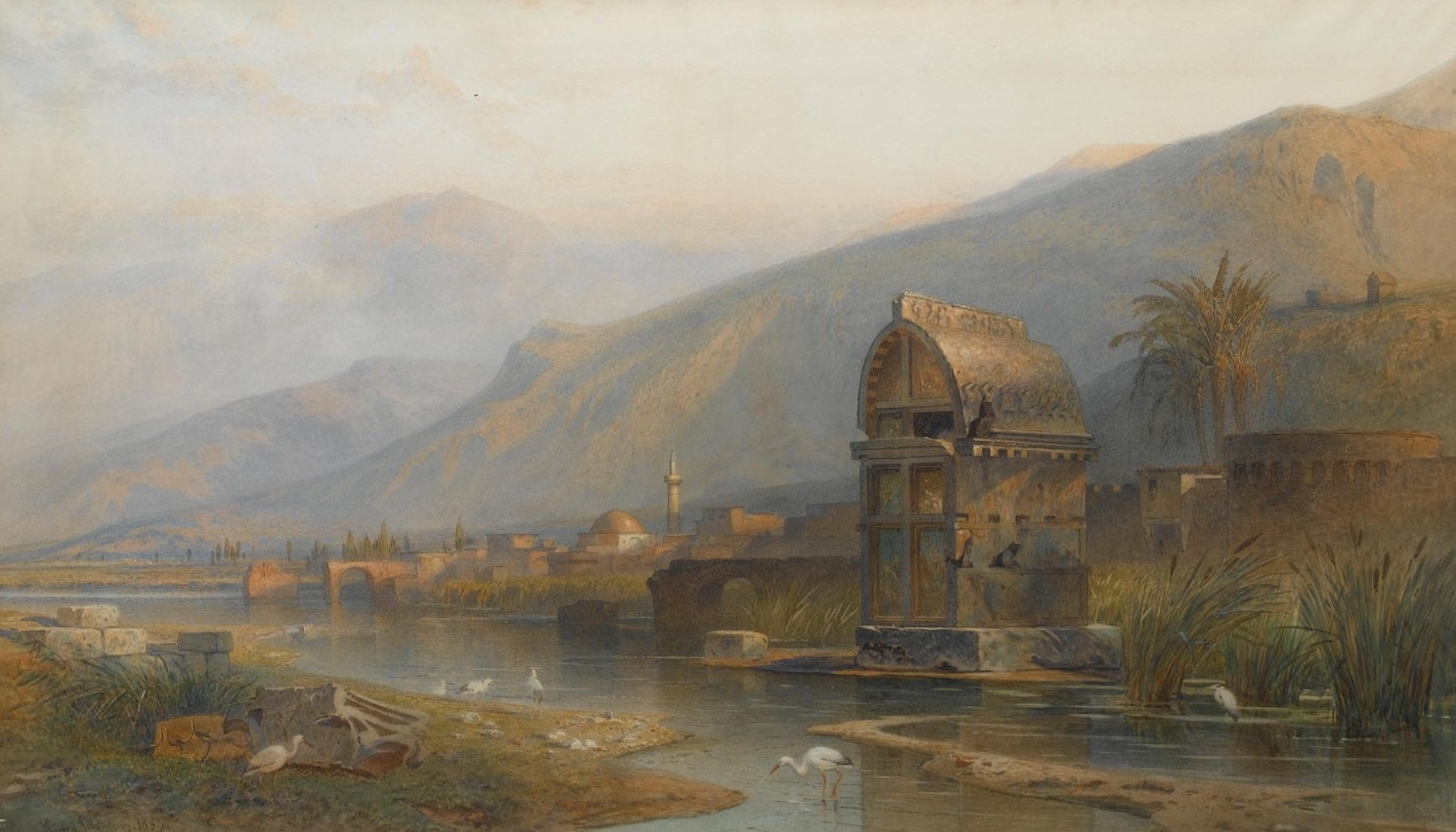
Lycian sarcophagus in the ancient city Telmessos.

Very little is known of the city during the Byzantine times. Surviving buildings attest to considerable prosperity during late Antiquity, but most were abandoned in the 7th–8th centuries due to the Arab-Byzantine Wars. The city was fortified in the 8th century, and appears as "Telmissos or Anastasioupolis" ca. 800. By the 10th century, the ancient name was forgotten and it became known as Makre or Makri (Μάκρη, "long one"), from the name of the island at the entrance to the harbour. There are signs of renewed prosperity in the 12-13th centuries: the city walls were enlarged, a report from 1106 names Makre a centre for perfume production, and geographical works from the 13th century describe the city as a commercial center. The area was conquered by the Turks in the late 12th or early 13th century.

Telmessos was ruled by the Anatolian beylik of Menteşe starting in 1284, under the name Beskaza.

It became part of the Ottoman Empire in 1424, and was called مكرى Meğri until 1934.

From 1867 until 1922, Meğri was part of the Aidin Vilayet of the Turkish Empire. The town grew considerably in the 19th century, and had a large Greek population at that time. Following the population exchange between Greece and Turkey, the Greeks of Makri were sent to Greece where they founded the town of Nea Makri (New Makri) in Greece. The town was resettled with Turks from Greece. At nearby Kayaköy, formerly Levissi, the abandoned Greek Orthodox church is still standing.

In 1934, the city was renamed Fethiye in honor of Captain Fethi Bey, one of the first pilots of the Ottoman Air Force, who died (together with First Lieutenant Tayyareci Sadık Bey) during an airplane crash on 27 February 1914 near Al-Samra, while attempting to complete the first flight from Istanbul to Cairo.

On 3 August 1953, Air France Flight 152, while en route from Rome to Beirut, ditched into the Gulf of Fethiye off Kızılada. Of the 8 crew and 34 passengers on board, four drowned. The survivors were hosted by the residents during their stay in the town.

Fethiye has experienced many powerful and occasionally destructive earthquakes, most notably the 1957 Fethiye earthquakes on 24–25 April with 67 casualties and 3,200 damaged or destroyed buildings, which constituted 90% of the buildings in the entire city. The town has been rebuilt since then and now has a modern harbor and a marina.

On 14 January 1969, Fethiye was struck by an earthquake with a magnitude of 6.2, which caused no deaths, but there were some injuries and significant damage to buildings.

On 10 June 2012, an earthquake with a magnitude of 6.1, struck Fethiye. There was no loss of life, but there were some injuries and many houses and workplaces were damaged.

== Sports ==
Founded in 1933 in Fethiye, Fethiyespor competes in the TFF 2nd League. The club plays its home matches at the Fethiye District Stadium.

== Tourism ==
Fethiye is one of Turkey's well-known tourist centers and is especially popular during the summer. The Fethiye Museum, which is rich in ancient and more recent artifacts, displays and testifies to the successive chain of civilizations that existed in the area, starting with the ancient Lycians.

Some of the historical sites worth visiting are: Kadyanda (Cadyanda) ancient city, Kayaköy - the abandoned Greek village, Afkule, Gemiler and Aya Nikola. Fethiye is also home to the Tomb of Amyntas, a large tomb built in 350 BC by the Lycians.

The most popular tourist towns of Fethiye are: Ölüdeniz, Çalış Beach area, Hisarönü and Ovacık, Fethiye. Butterfly Valley is in the Fethiye district.

The island of Kızılada in the Gulf of Fethiye, 4 mi (6.4 km) off the city, is a popular stopover for boat tours. Alternatively, there are great diving sites, Afkule being one of the most famous. The Kızılada Lighthouse on the island houses a seafood restaurant and a hostel with nine rooms.

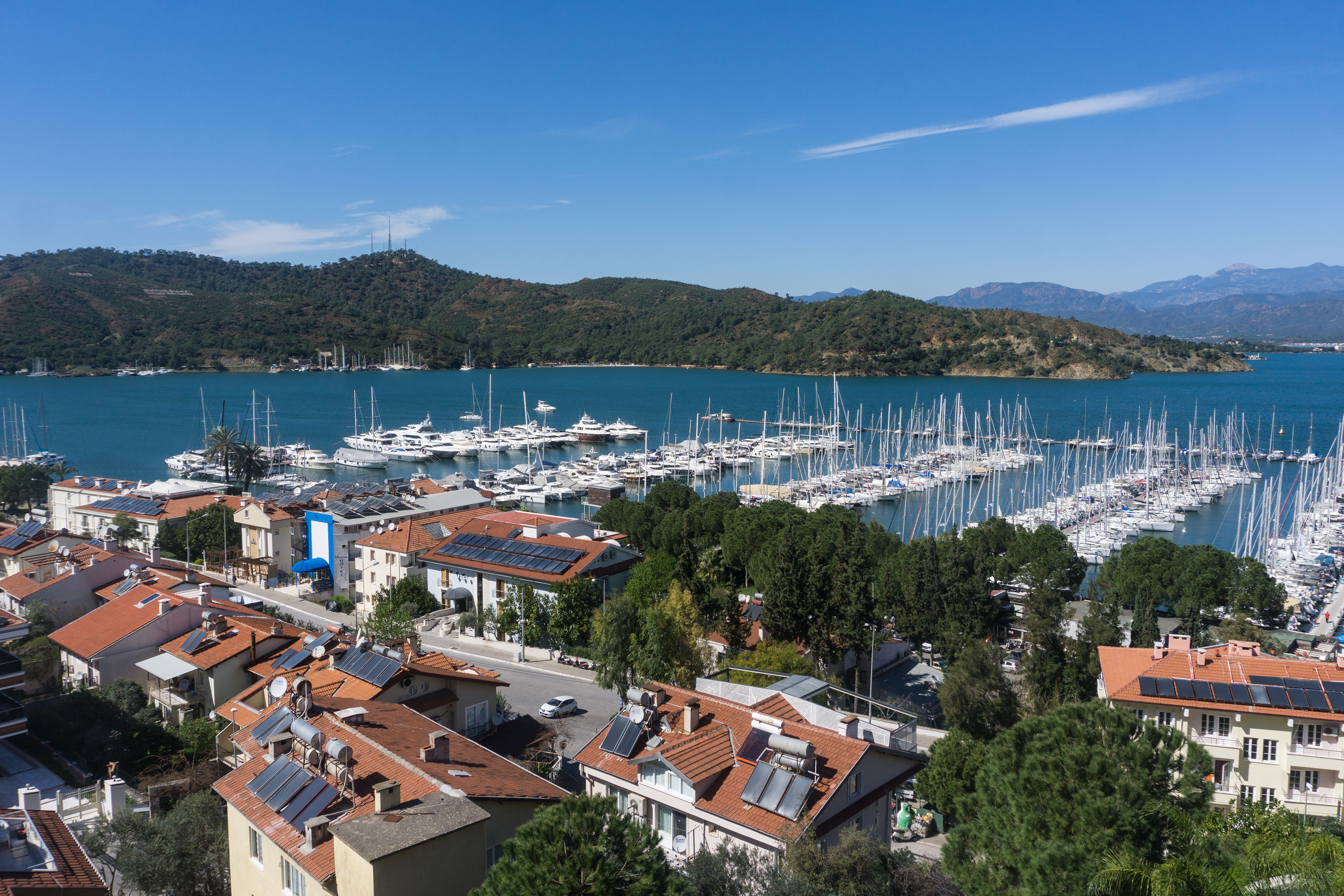
Marina of Fethiye

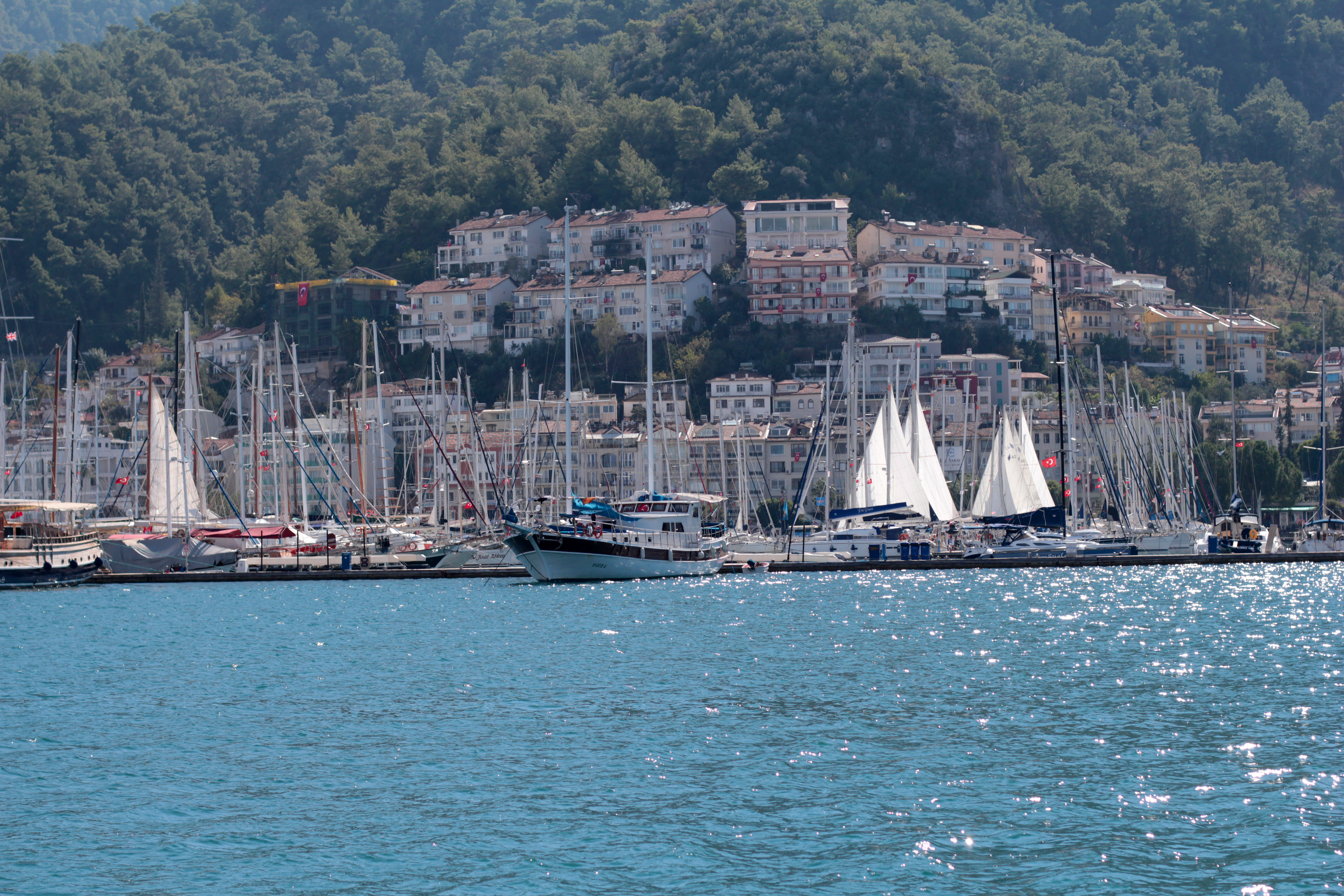
Fethiye bay

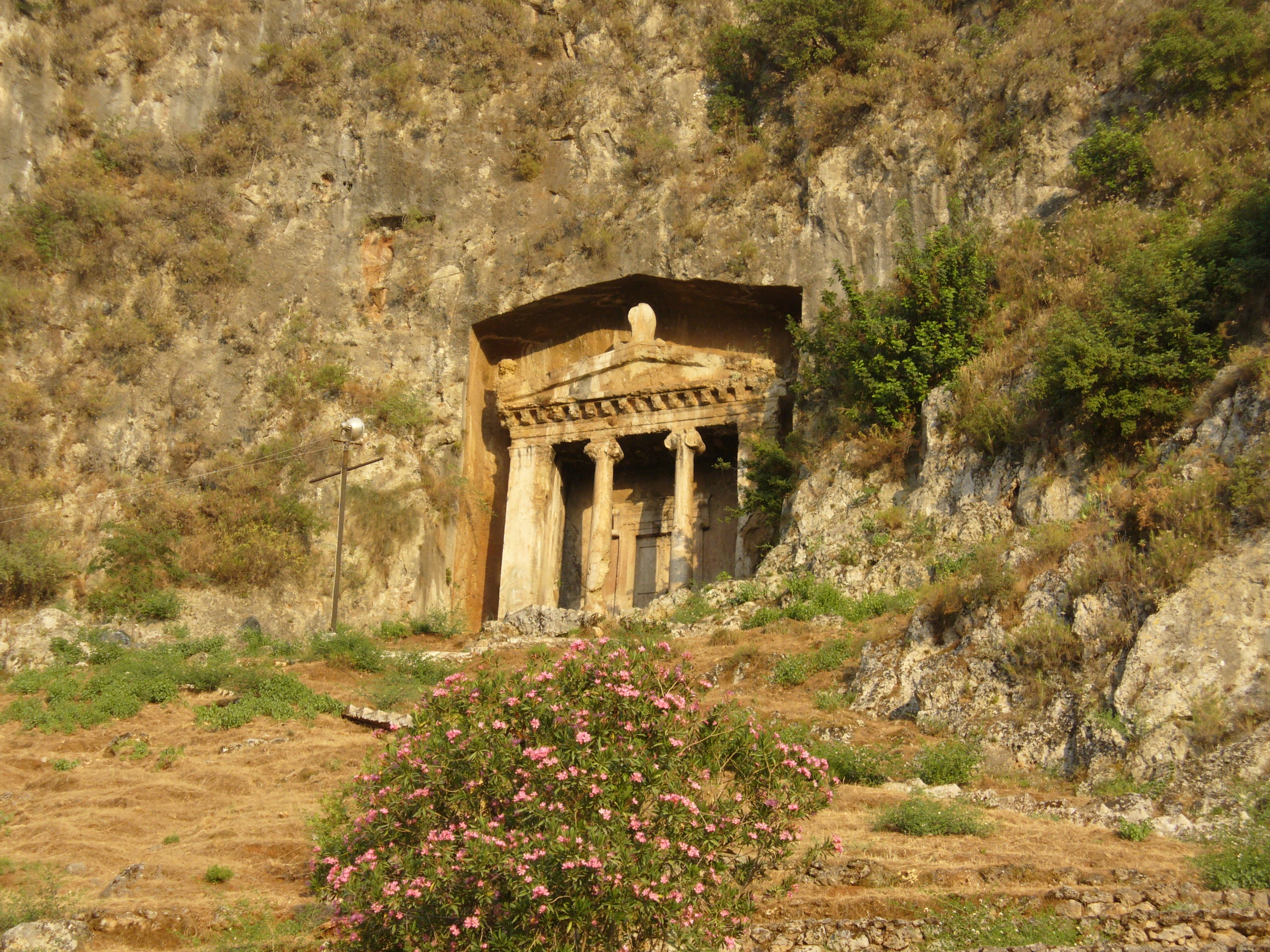
The Tomb of Amyntas in Fethiye

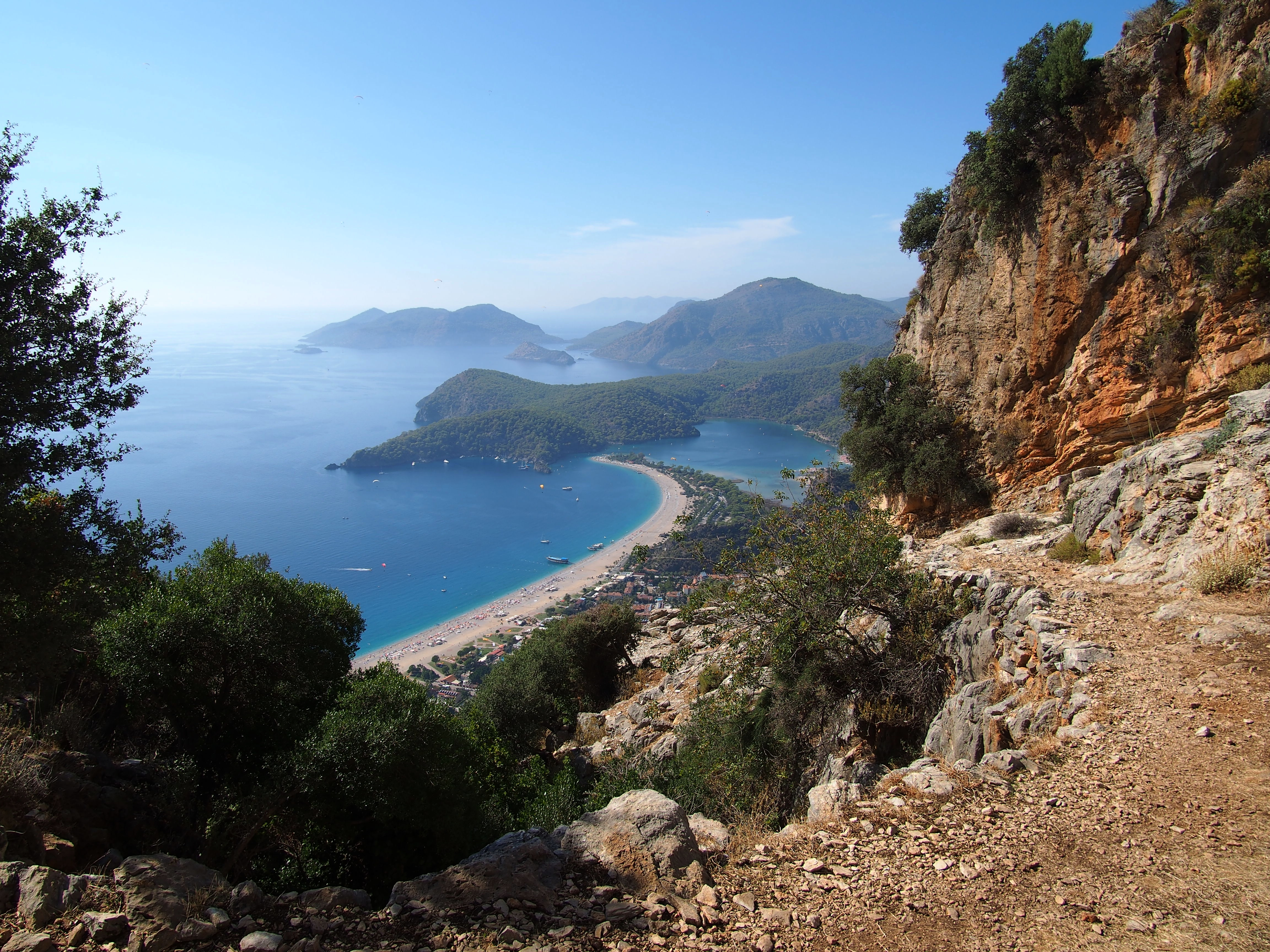
Ölüdeniz Beach in Fethiye District

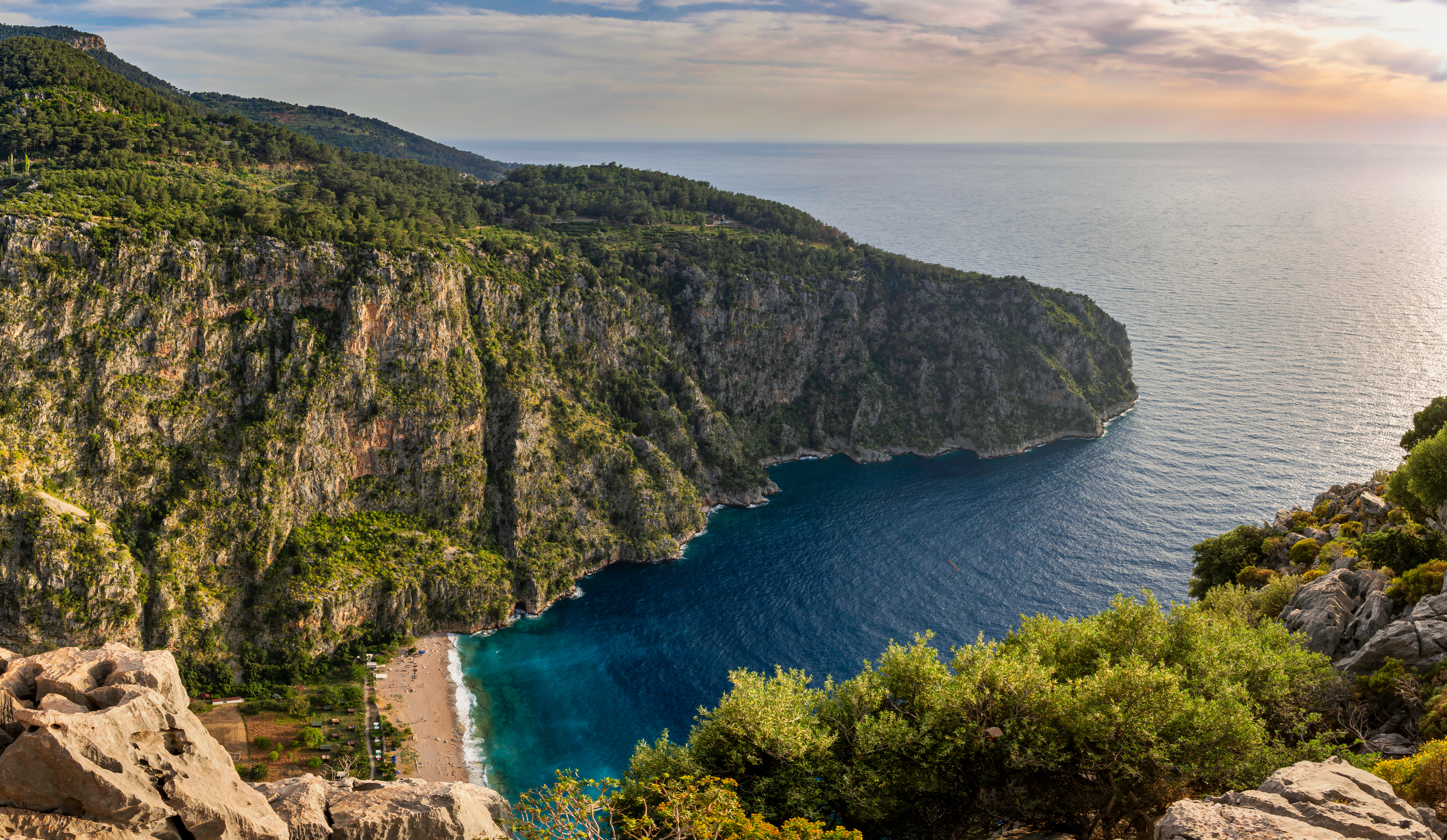
Butterfly Valley is a popular tourism destination in Fethiye District

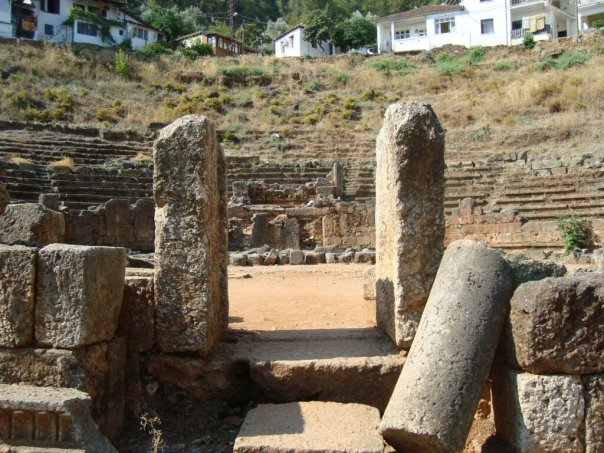
Telmessos Theatre – the sign on site says it was late Hellenistic, with stage added in c. 200 AD, abandoned with the city, excavated in 1992–95, and with seating capacity for 6,000 spectators on 28 rows.

== Composition ==
There are 41 neighbourhoods in Fethiye District:

- Akarca
- Babataşı
- Bozyer
- Cami
- Çamköy
- Çatalarık
- Çenger
- Çiftlik
- Cumhuriyet
- Eldirek
- Esenköy
- Faralya
- Foça
- Göcek
- Gökben
- Gökçeovacık
- İncirköy
- İnlice
- Karaağaç
- Karacaören
- Karaçulha
- Karagedik
- Karagözler
- Karakeçililer
- Kargı
- Kayaköy
- Kesikkapı
- Kızılbel
- Koruköy
- Menteşeoğlu
- Nif
- Ölüdeniz
- Patlangıç
- Pazaryeri
- Söğütlü
- Taşyaka
- Tuzla
- Yakacık
- Yanıklar
- Yeni
- Yeşilüzümlü

== Climate ==
Fethiye has a Mediterranean climate consisting of hot, long and dry summers with an average of 34 °C (93 °F) in the daytime. Climate change is affecting the temperatures with the summers becoming hotter and drier than previously. The winters are mild and rainy with a daytime average of 16 °C (61 °F).

The classification for the climate of Fethiye is Csa (Köppen) and Csal (Trewartha)

Climate data for Fethiye (1991-2020)
Month	Jan	Feb	Mar	Apr	May	Jun	Jul	Aug	Sep	Oct	Nov	Dec	Year
Mean daily maximum °C (°F)	16.3 (61.3)	17.0 (62.6)	19.5 (67.1)	22.6 (72.7)	27.0 (80.6)	32.1 (89.8)	35.1 (95.2)	35.4 (95.7)	31.9 (89.4)	27.2 (81.0)	22.0 (71.6)	17.6 (63.7)	25.3 (77.5)
Daily mean °C (°F)	10.5 (50.9)	11.4 (52.5)	13.7 (56.7)	16.7 (62.1)	21.0 (69.8)	25.8 (78.4)	28.7 (83.7)	28.8 (83.8)	25.2 (77.4)	20.4 (68.7)	15.3 (59.5)	11.7 (53.1)	19.1 (66.4)
Mean daily minimum °C (°F)	6.0 (42.8)	6.7 (44.1)	8.4 (47.1)	11.2 (52.2)	15.4 (59.7)	19.5 (67.1)	22.4 (72.3)	22.6 (72.7)	19.0 (66.2)	14.6 (58.3)	10.2 (50.4)	7.4 (45.3)	13.7 (56.7)
Average precipitation mm (inches)	174.4 (6.87)	116.9 (4.60)	74.4 (2.93)	49.7 (1.96)	30.4 (1.20)	4.7 (0.19)	0.7 (0.03)	1.6 (0.06)	17.8 (0.70)	72.7 (2.86)	119.0 (4.69)	181.2 (7.13)	843.4 (33.20)
Average precipitation days (≥ 1.0 mm)	10.5	8.5	6.5	5.6	3.5	1.4	1.0	1.7	2.2	4.1	6.0	10.2	61.2
Average relative humidity (%)	67.3	64.0	62.6	62.5	61.0	55.8	54.8	56.4	57.6	62.8	67.9	70.5	61.9
Mean monthly sunshine hours	139.1	151.6	215.5	248.0	300.7	344.6	367.8	338.0	294.1	238.7	171.6	128.0	2,927.9
Source: NOAA

Climate data for Fethiye
Month	Jan	Feb	Mar	Apr	May	Jun	Jul	Aug	Sep	Oct	Nov	Dec	Year
Mean daily maximum °C (°F)	16.0 (60.8)	16.3 (61.3)	18.9 (66.0)	22.0 (71.6)	26.4 (79.5)	31.4 (88.5)	34.3 (93.7)	34.4 (93.9)	31.3 (88.3)	26.5 (79.7)	21.1 (70.0)	17.2 (63.0)	24.7 (76.4)
Mean daily minimum °C (°F)	5.3 (41.5)	5.7 (42.3)	7.2 (45.0)	10.1 (50.2)	13.8 (56.8)	17.6 (63.7)	20.3 (68.5)	20.2 (68.4)	16.9 (62.4)	13.1 (55.6)	9.1 (48.4)	6.6 (43.9)	12.2 (53.9)
Average precipitation mm (inches)	159.8 (6.29)	128.4 (5.06)	80.1 (3.15)	49.0 (1.93)	25.8 (1.02)	4.8 (0.19)	3.1 (0.12)	2.6 (0.10)	17.6 (0.69)	66.7 (2.63)	123.3 (4.85)	174.1 (6.85)	835.3 (32.88)
Average rainy days	12.1	11.3	9.0	8.0	4.4	2.2	1.4	1.6	2.5	5.7	8.3	12.1	78.6
Mean monthly sunshine hours	145.7	156.8	213.9	237.0	300.7	342.0	359.6	344.1	294.0	244.9	165.0	127.1	2,930.8
Source: Devlet Meteoroloji İşleri Genel Müdürlüğü

== Transport ==
Dalaman Airport serves the Fethiye areas. Public transport is by (intercity-)bus and by minibus, commonly known in Turkey as dolmuş (dol-moosh) and numerous routes connect Fethiye with Ölüdeniz, Yaniklar, Kargi, Hisaronu, Ovacik, Seydikemer, Karaçulha.

== Areas ==
The overall metropolitan area of the city of Fethiye stretches inland from the harbor for more than 11 km, incorporating several villages into the city. To the north of the city center is the area of Çalış Plajı (Beach), which incorporates the main street of Barış Manço Bulvarı alongside an extensive promenade along the coast, on which a lot of hotels are based. This beach serves as Fethiye's beach in its own right, since Fethiye does not actually have one itself. To the east, lie the areas of Günlükbaşı, Çamköy, Cumhuriyet, and also Esenköy to the south-east. The city center is defined as the area between the Marina and the Fethiye Market near the football stadium. Approximately 4 km to the south-west and south respectively, lie the towns of Kayaköy and Ölüdeniz, the latter being world-famous for its beach spit and associated Blue Lagoon. The opportunity for paragliding is available from the mountain of Babadağ in Ölüdeniz, from various extreme sports companies located in the area.

== Gallery ==
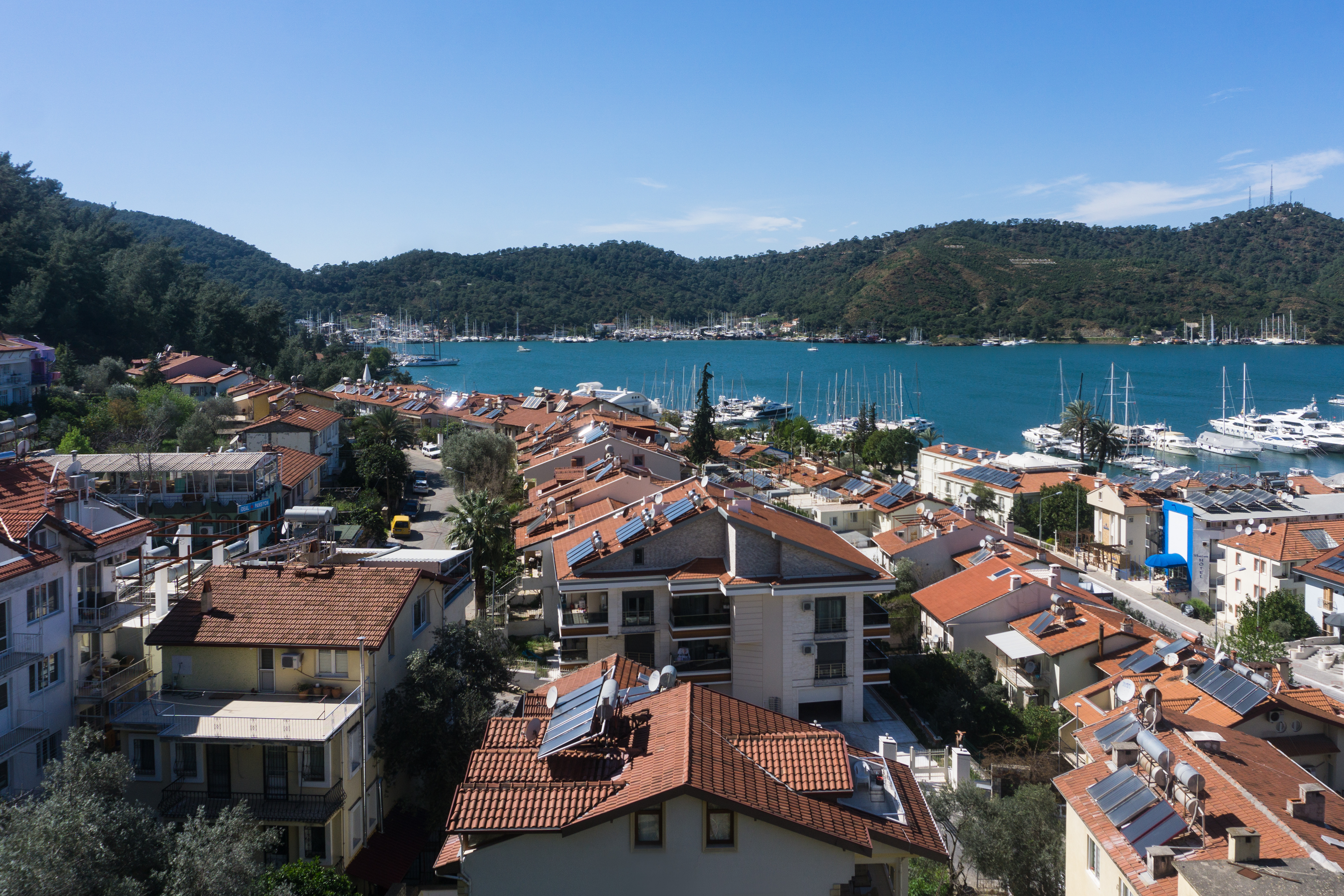
A view from central Fethiye

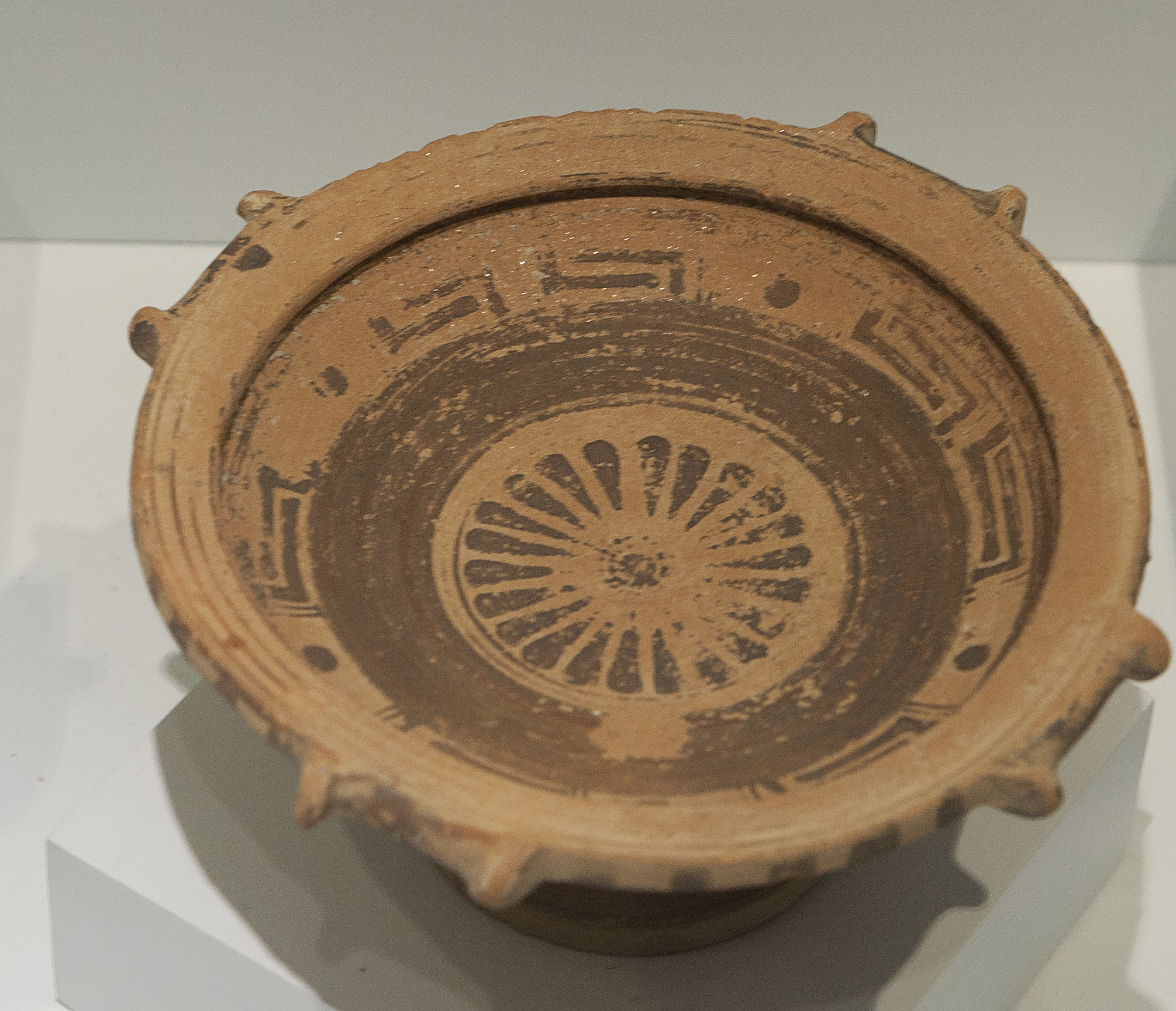
Fethiye Museum Ceramic

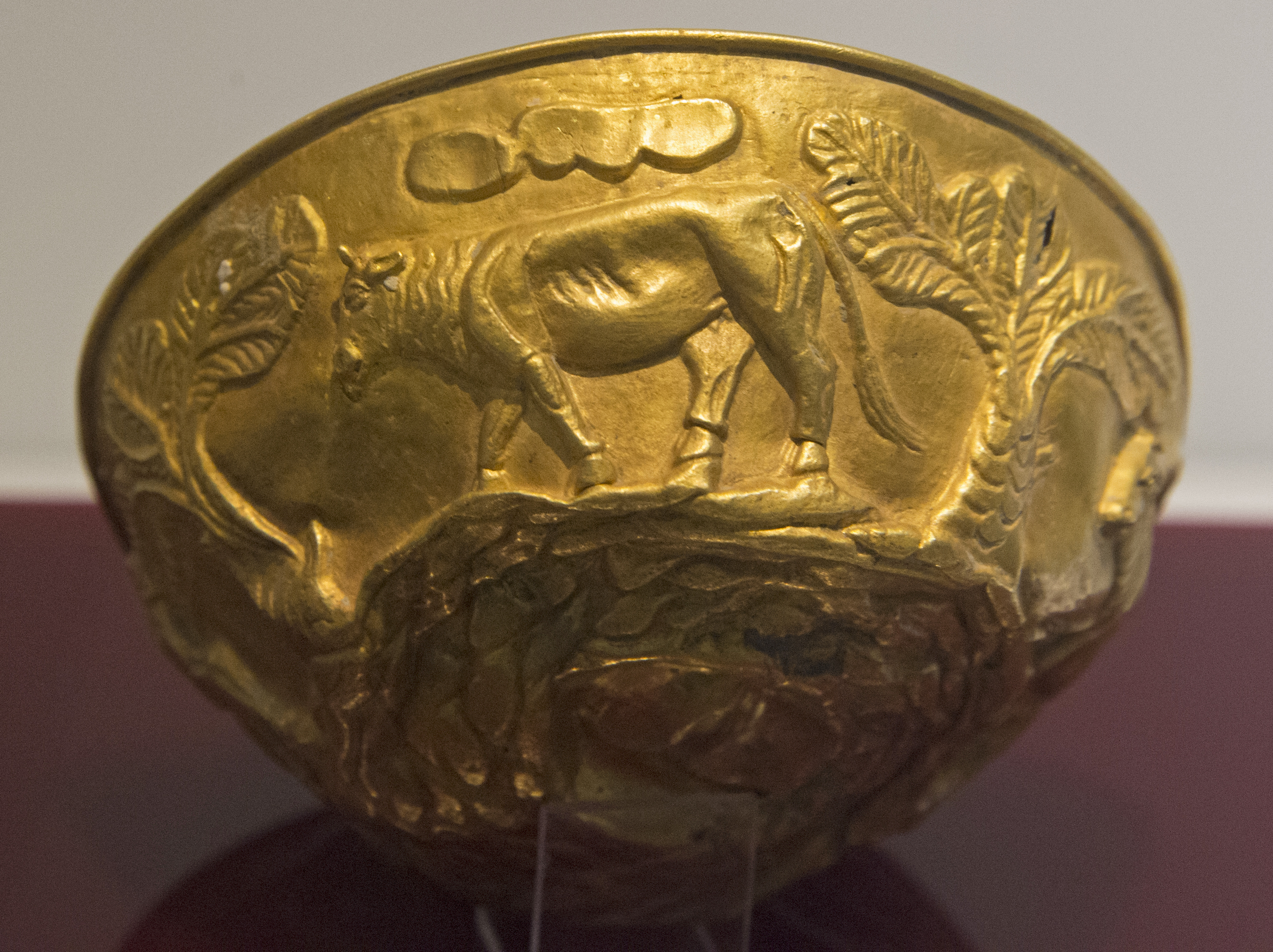
Gold ceremonial bowl

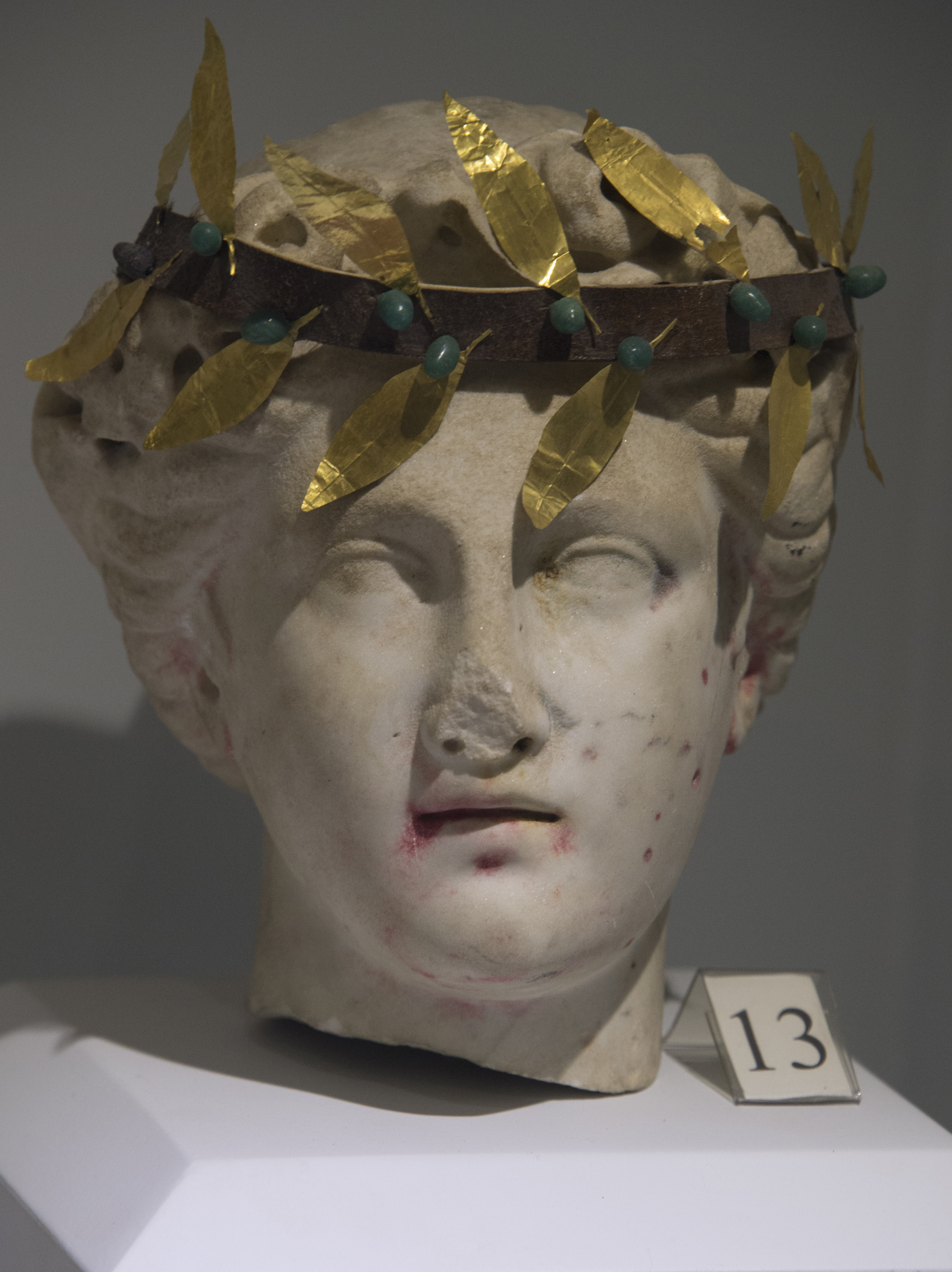
Gold laurel wreath

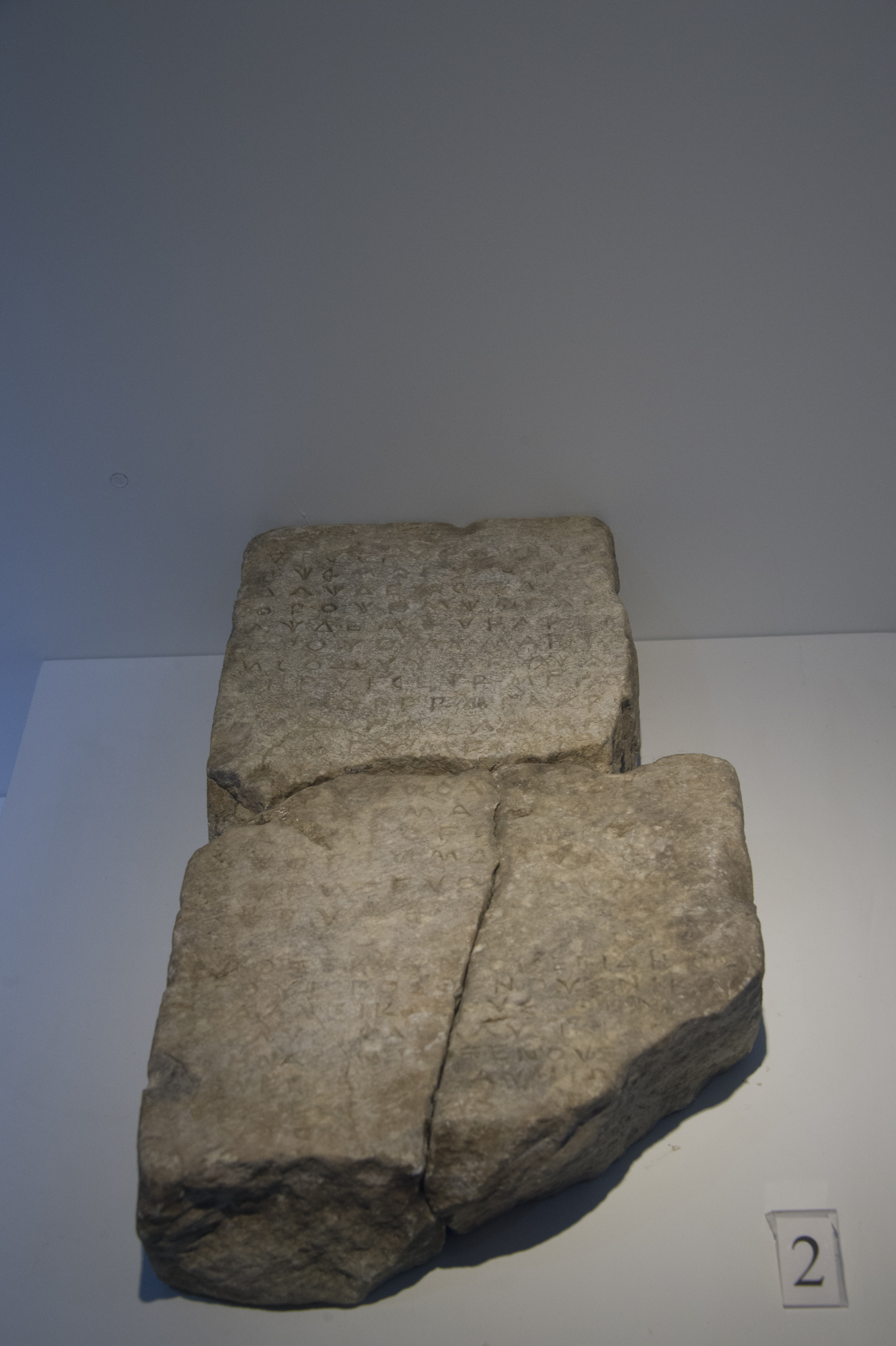
Bilingual inscription

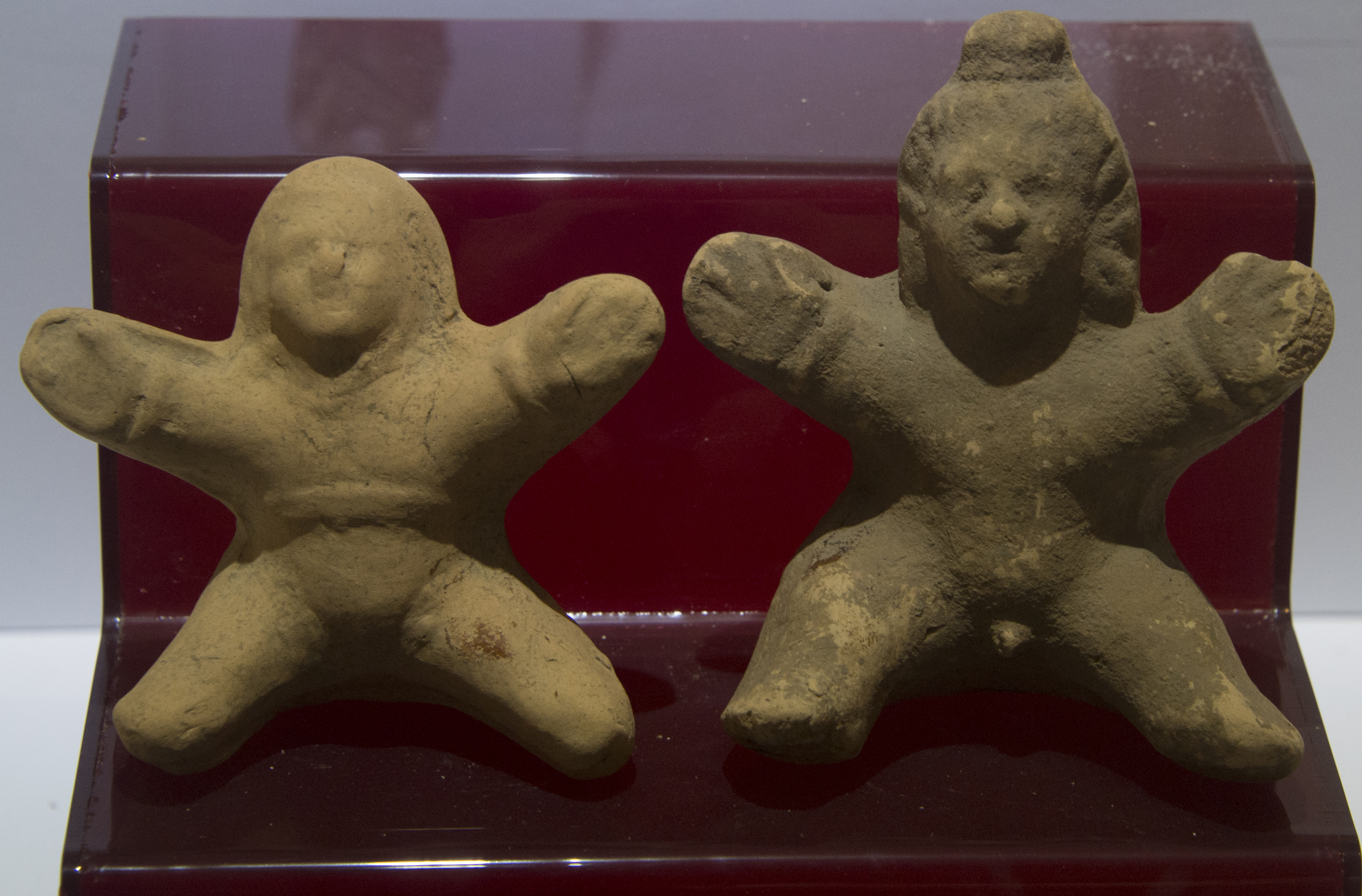
Dolls

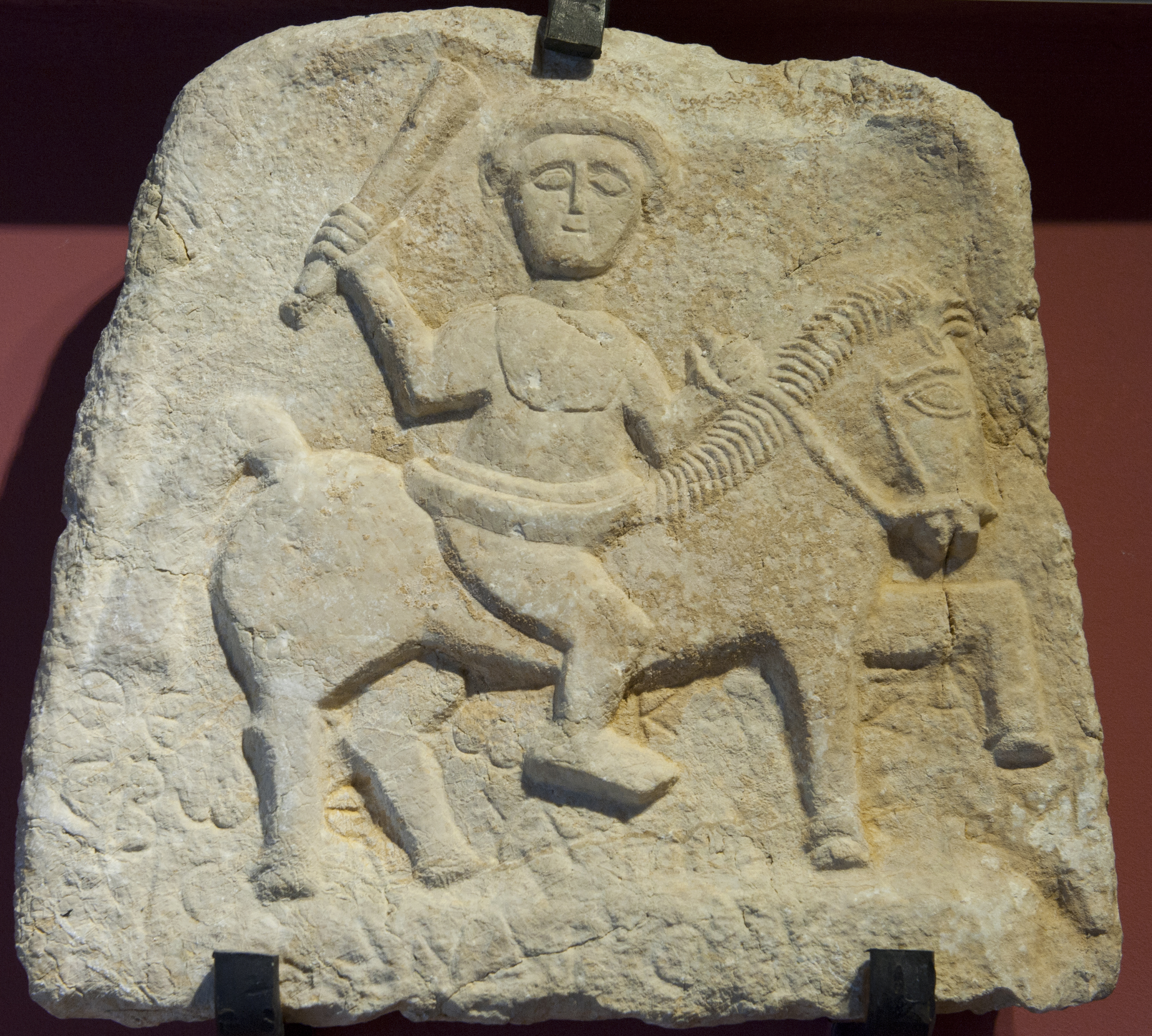
Kakasbos

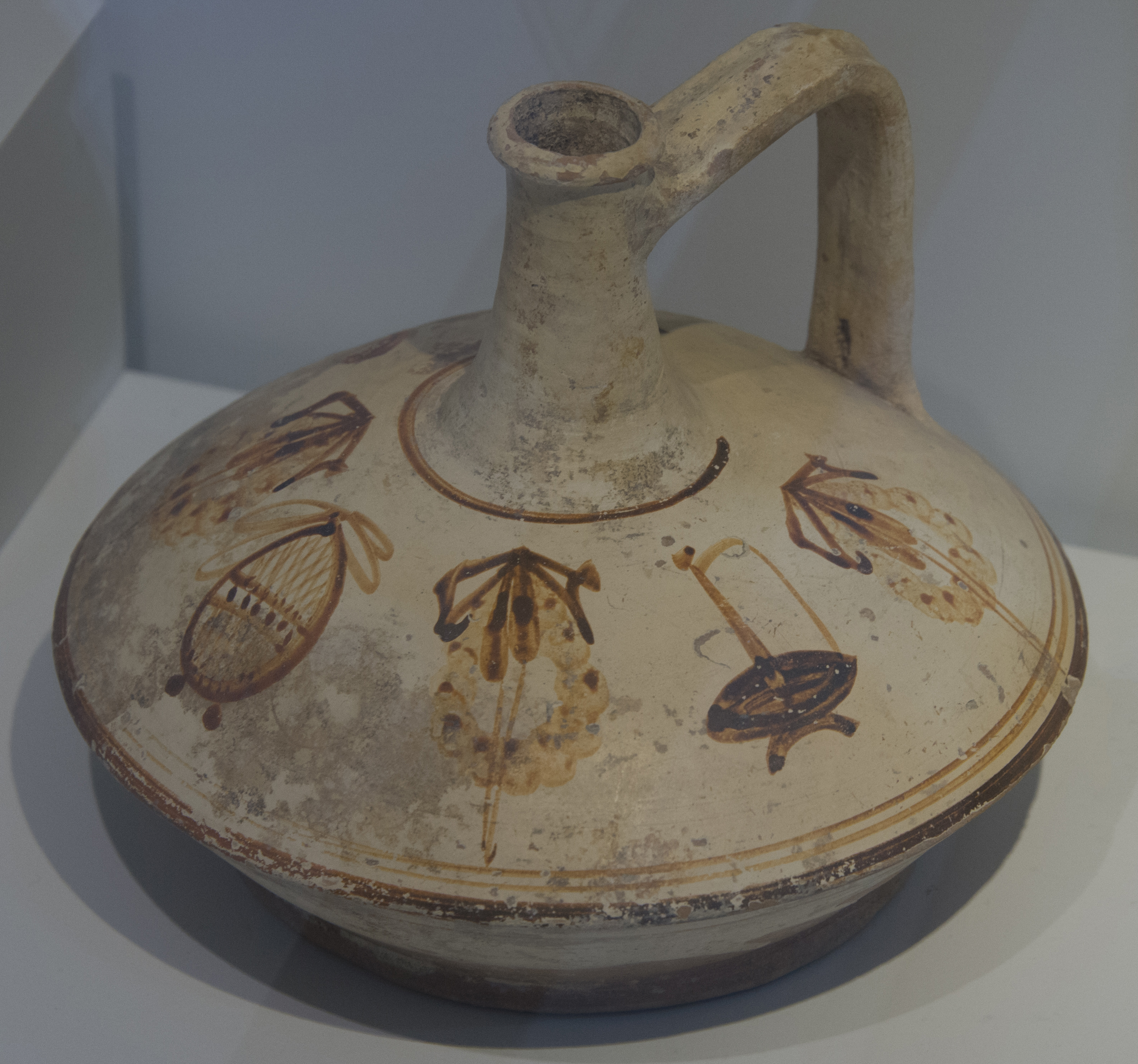
Lagynos

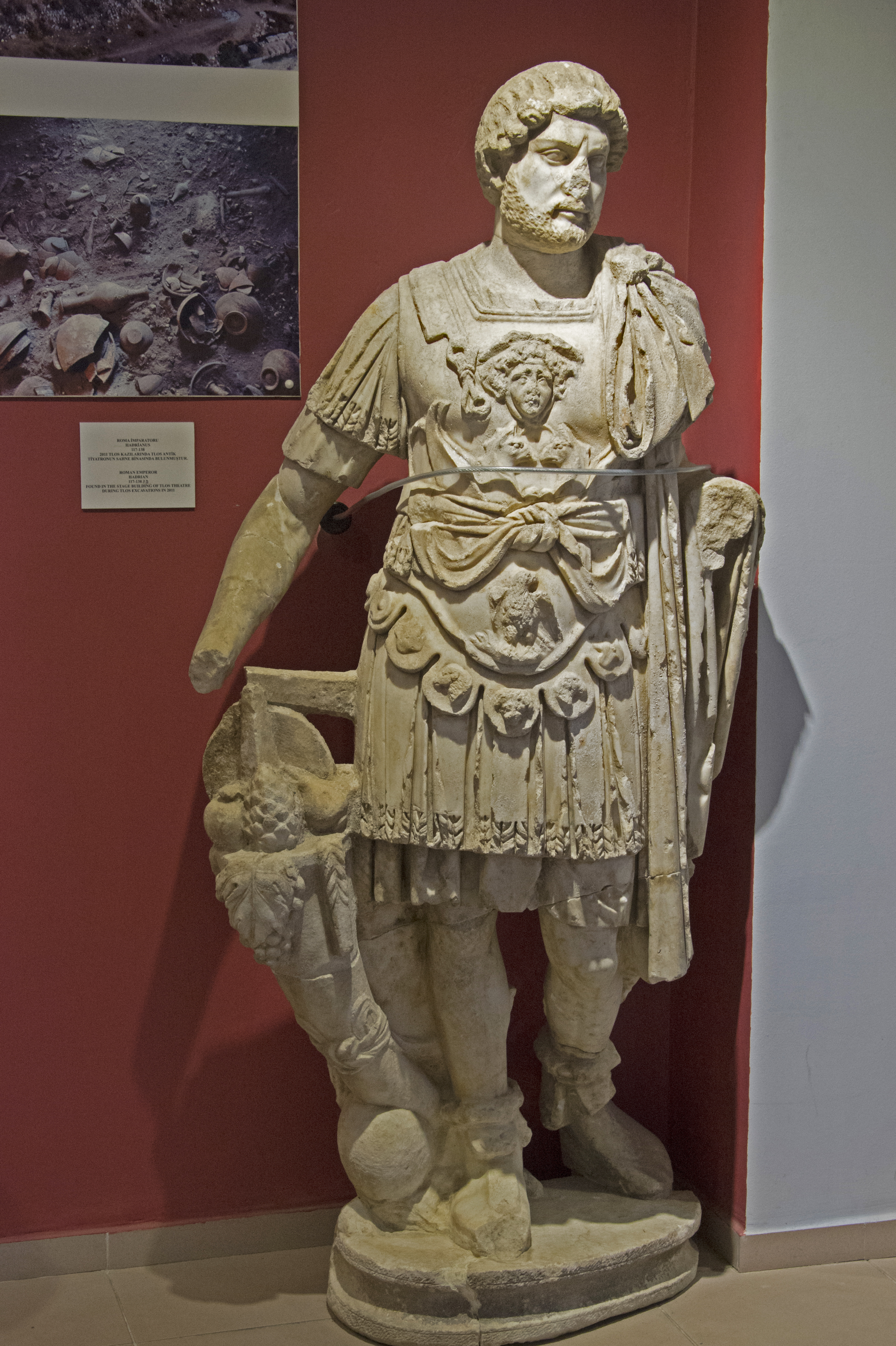
Hadrian statue

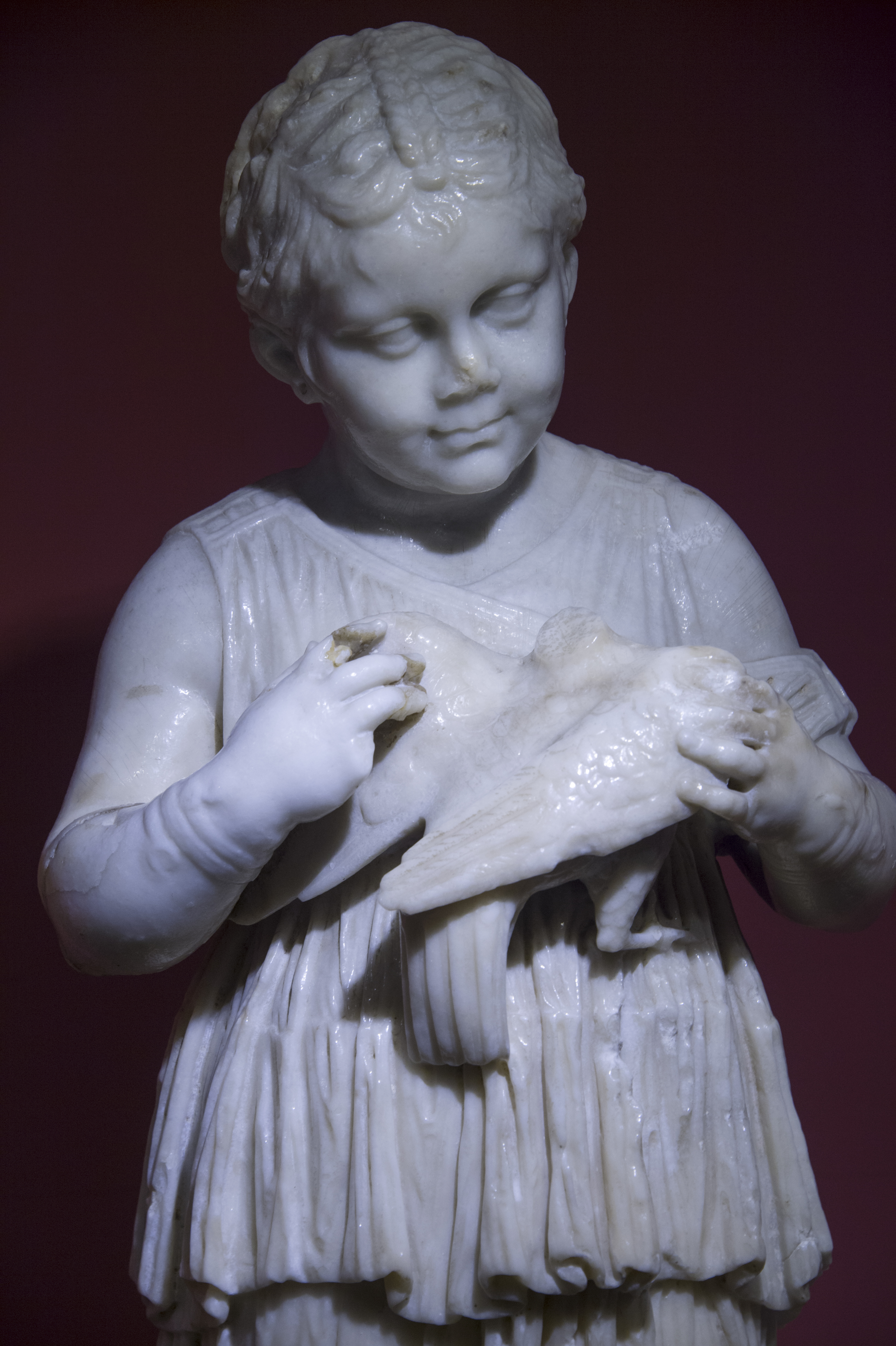
Girl statue

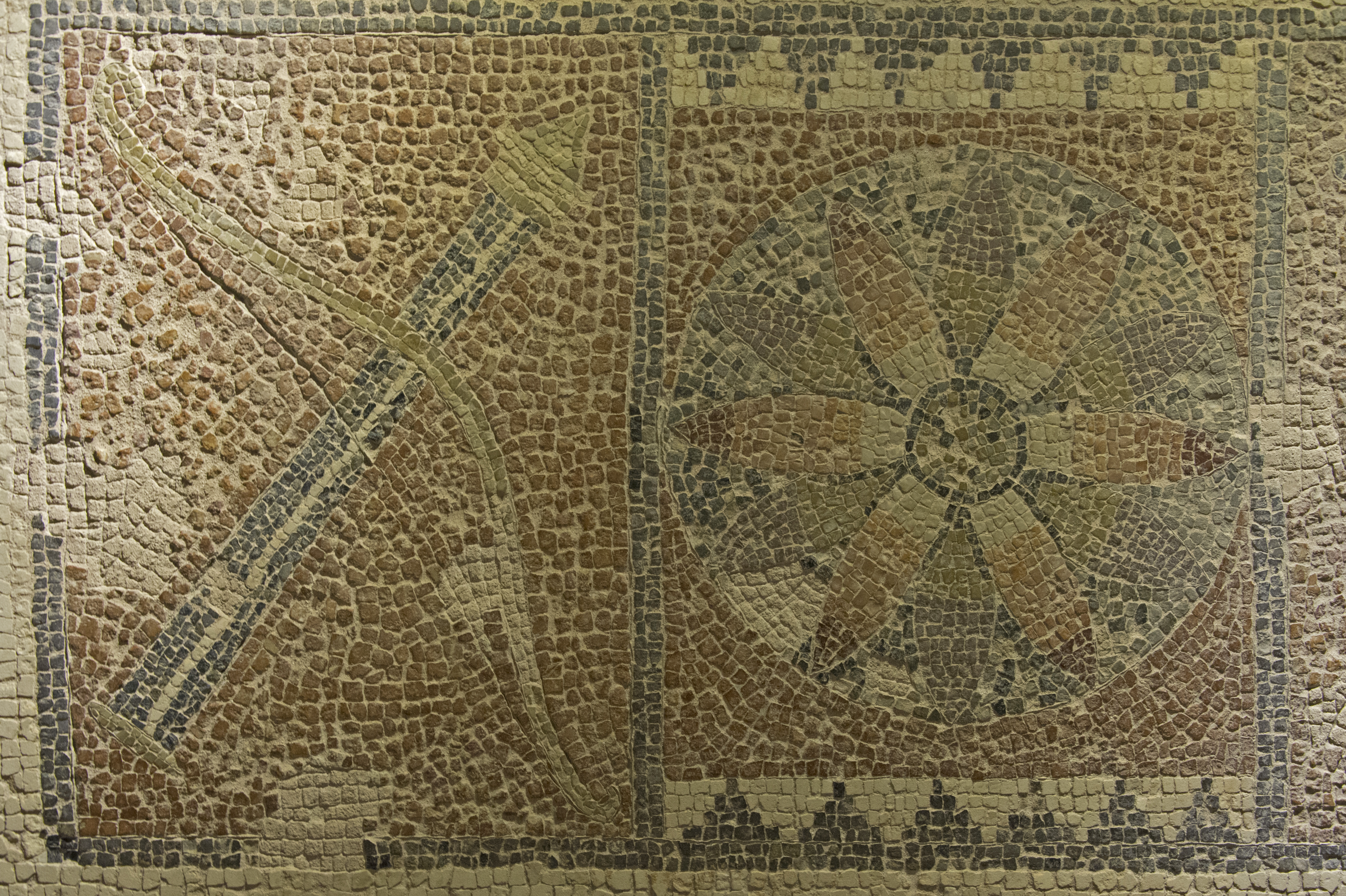
Letoon temple floor decoration

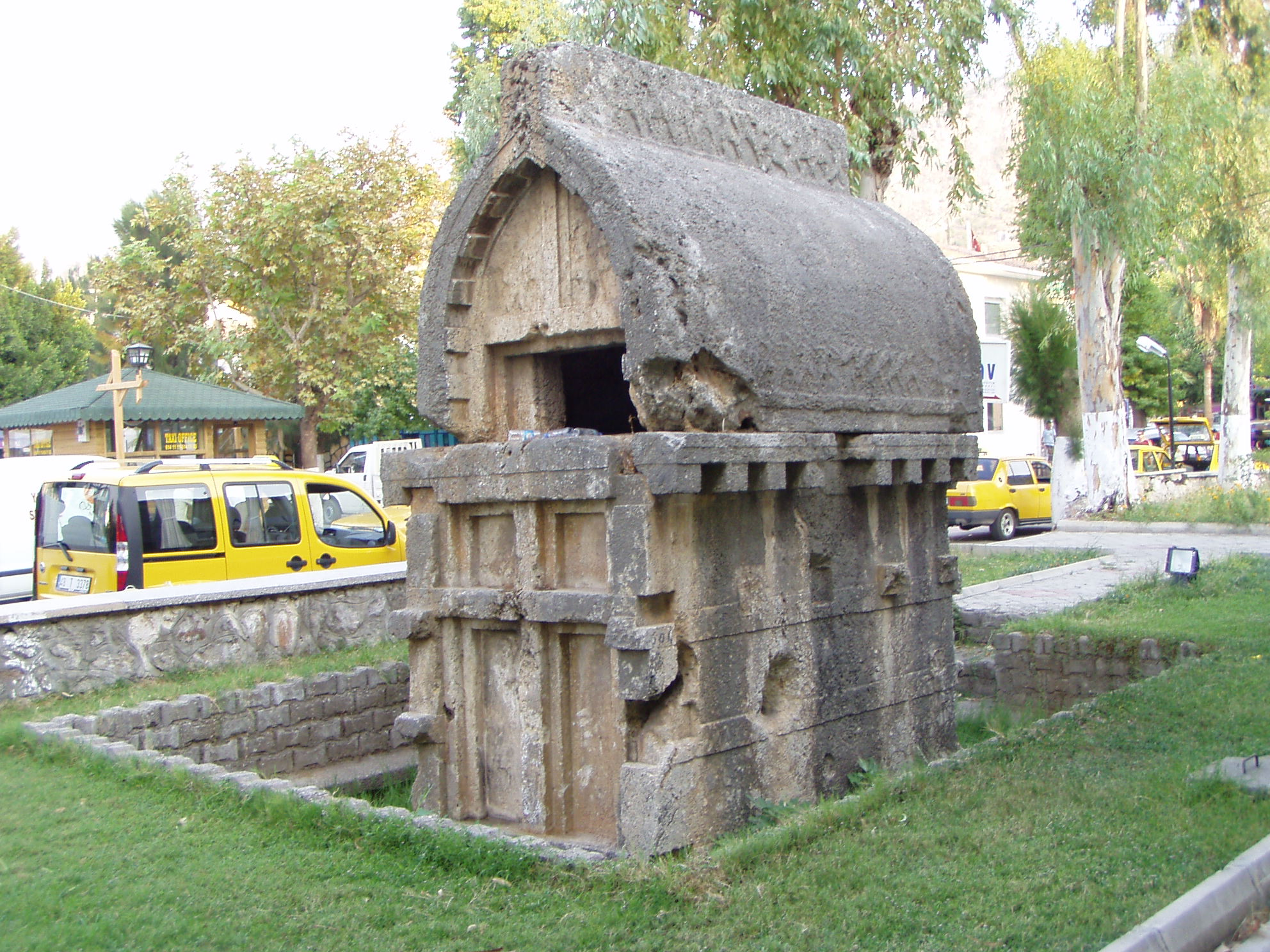
Lycian rock tomb in Fethiye (4th century BCE)

== See also ==
- Göcek, Fethiye
- Seydikemer
- Kayaköy
