= Faralya =

- Neighbourhood
- Location in Turkey Faralya (Turkey Aegean)
- Coordinates: 36.483°N 29.118°E
- Country: Turkey
- Province: Muğla
- District: Fethiye
- Population (2022): 640
- Time zone: UTC+3 (TRT)

Faralya is a neighborhood of the municipality and district of Fethiye, Muğla Province, Turkey. Its population is 640 (2022).

== Geography ==
The village is 165 km from Muğla, 25 km from Fethiye and 10 km from the sea. It is possible to reach historical Roman and Lycian ruins, Butterfly Valley and various natural riches in the region where the neighborhood is located (within an area of 40 km).

== Population ==
Historical population
Year	Pop.	±% p.a.
1990	1,293	—
1997	508	−12.49%
2007	454	−1.12%
2012	484	+1.29%
2017	554	+2.74%
2022	640	+2.93%
Source: 1990 census, 1997 census and TÜIK (2007-2022)
