= Turkish Foundation for Combating Soil Erosion =

Turkish non-governmental organization

TEMA
- Turkish Foundation for Combating Soil Erosion
- Türkiye Erozyonla Mücadele Ağaçlandırma ve Doğal Varlıkları Koruma Vakfı
- Abbreviation: TEMA
- Formation: September 11, 1992; 33 years ago
- Type: NGO
- Legal status: Foundation
- Purpose: Environmental for reforestation and the protection of natural habitat
- Headquarters: Levent, Istanbul, Turkey
- Coordinates: 41.07931°N 29.01345°E
- Region served: Turkey
- Website: www.tema.org.tr

The Turkish Foundation for Combating Soil Erosion (Turkish: Türkiye Erozyonla Mücadele, Ağaçlandırma ve Doğal Varlıkları Koruma Vakfı), better known in abbreviated form as TEMA, is a non-governmental organization (NGO) for reforestation and the protection of natural habitats in Turkey.

== History ==
TEMA was founded in 1992 by Turkish businessmen Hayrettin Karaca, who has a UN Environment Award, and Nihat Gökyiğit. TEMA is the leading NGO in Turkey with over 451,000 voluntary members. TEMA is one of the winners of the first UN Convention to Combat Desertification (UNCCD) Land for Life Awards.

== Projects ==
=== Oak Project ===
The Oak Project (Turkish: Meşe Projesi), which TEMA has maintained since 1998, aims to create vibrant oak forests over 1 million hectares of land throughout Turkey. The project materialized in collaboration with the Ministry of Agriculture and Forestry and has a total cost of approximately $1.8 billion.

=== Memory Forest ===
A protocol was signed between the Ministry of Agriculture and Forestry General Directorate of Reforestation and Erosion Control and TEMA. Pursuant to this protocol, planting projects would be completed on behalf of people and institutions in various provinces. Thus far, 389,718 saplings have been planted in commemorative forests in places such as Malkara, Mudanya, Konya, Samsun, Izmir, Şanlıurfa, Antalya, Kızılcahamam, and Adıyaman.

=== Bodrum Türkbükü Biological Diversity and Vegetation Project ===
A 130-hectare area located within the borders of the Türkbükü and Gündoğan villages in the district of Bodrum in the province of Muğla was surrounded with razor wire and fencing to protect and develop natural plant species. In this space, 43,450 plants and shrubs will be planted, including oak, Turkish pine, black locust, gumwood, cactus, almond, horse chestnut, and cypress species.

=== TEM Highway Vegetation Project ===
TEMA, in collaboration with the General Directorate for Motorways and the General Directorate of Reforestation and Erosion Control, planted trees along a 333-kilometer stretch of the Ankara-Istanbul section of the Trans-European Motorway. Within the scope of this project, 49,321 various species of trees have been planted along the Kınalı junction of the Istanbul-Edirne stretch of the highway, and 241,844 trees have been planted along the Susuz junction of the Ankara-Istanbul stretch, including saplings, decorative foliage, and oak seeds.
