= Kızılağaç =

Kızılağaç may refer to the following settlements in Turkey:

- Kızılağaç, Bodrum, a village with historic ruins near Bodrum in Muğla Province
- Kızılağaç, Karlıova, a village in Bingöl Province
- Kızılağaç, Kaş, a neighbourhood in Antalya Province
- Kızılağaç, Manavgat, a neighbourhood in Antalya Province
- Kızılağaç, Muş, a town in Muş Province
- Kızılağaç, Saimbeyli, a neighbourhood in Adana Province
