= Geriş, Bodrum =

Geriş
- Neighbourhood
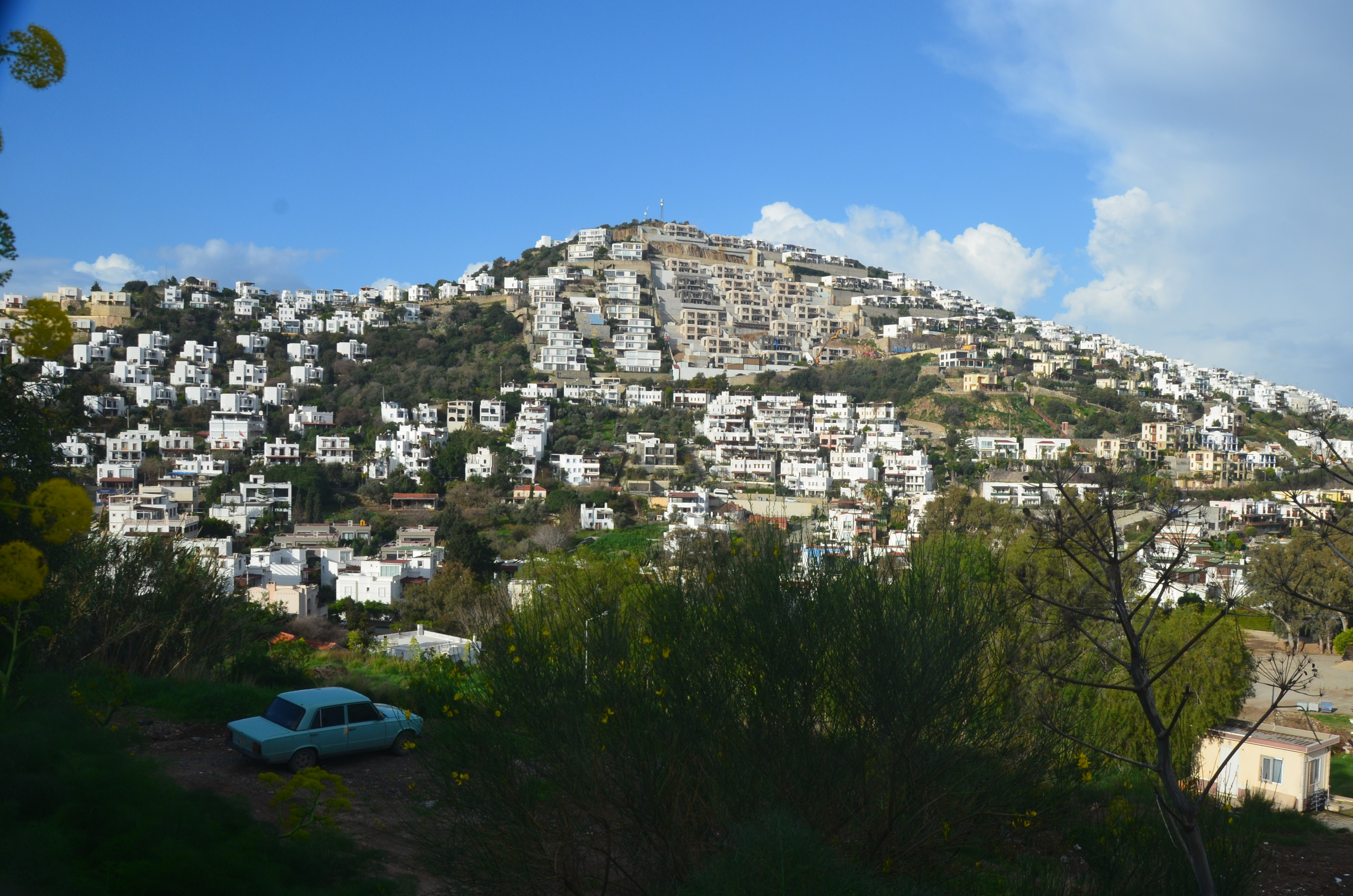
- A view of hillside houses in Geriş

- Location within Turkey Location within Turkey Aegean
- Coordinates: 37.08°N 27.28°E
- Country: Turkey
- Province: Muğla
- District: Bodrum
- Elevation: 165 m (541 ft)
- Population (2023): 3,863
- Time zone: UTC+3 (TRT)
- Postal code: 48990
- Area code: 0252

Geriş is a neighbourhood of the municipality and district of Bodrum, Muğla Province, Turkey. It is located betqeen the neighbourhoods of Yalıkavak in the southwest and Koyunbaba in the northeast, on a bay at the Aegean Sea. As of 2023, its population is 3,863. Before the 2013 Turkish local government reorganisation, it was a village.

On two hills above Geriş, about 3 km (1.9 mi) southwest of Yalıkavak, there are ruins of a settlement, thought to be called Uranion, of the ancient people Leleges. Ruins of a mausoleum, walls and bastions can be seen on the coastal hill, and ruins of city walls can be seen on the other hill.

The women's handball club Yalıkavak SK, which play in the Turkish Women's Handball Super League and compete at European level, is based at Türkan Saylan Sports Complex in Geriş.

== Gallery ==
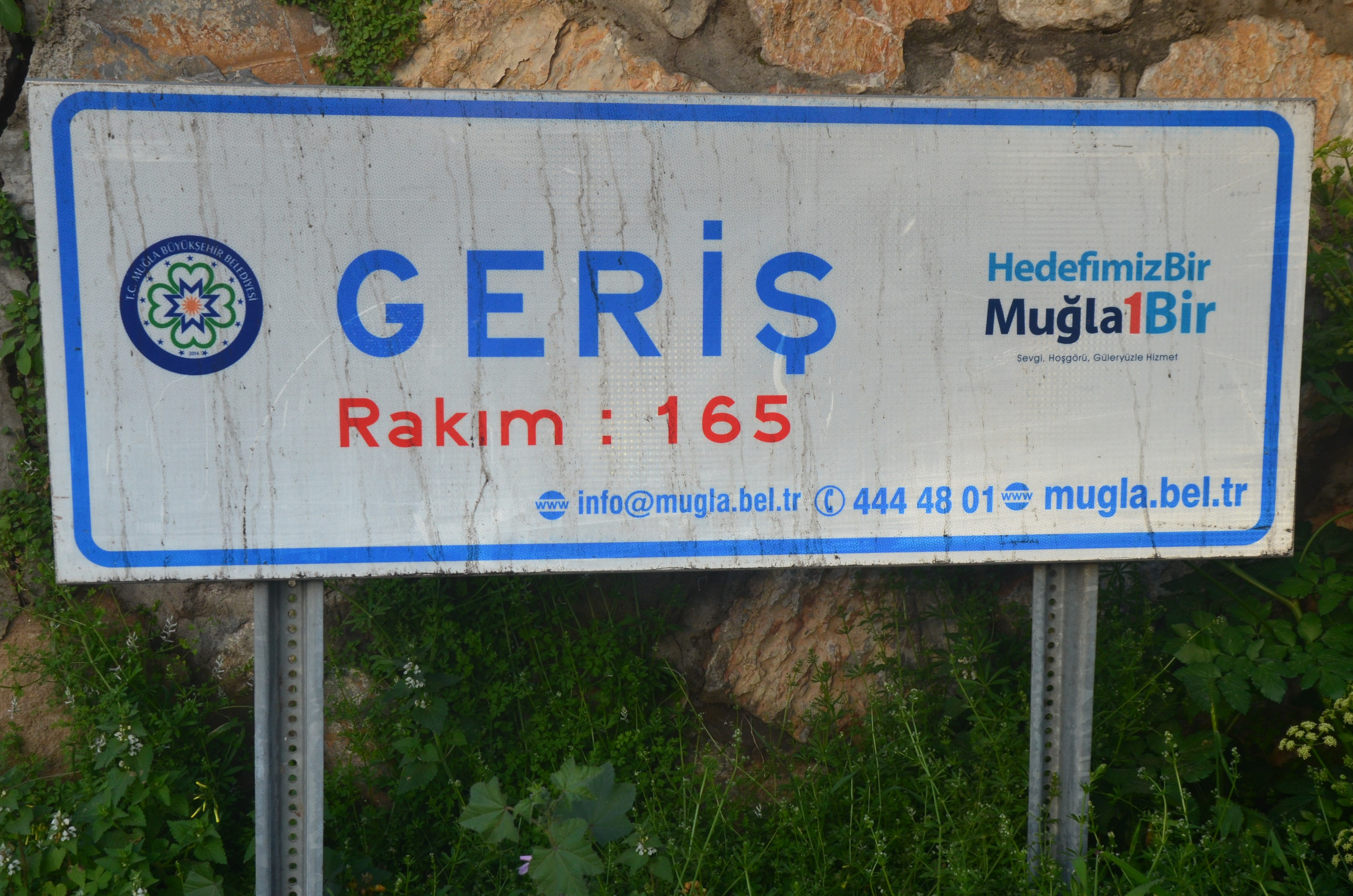
Place name sign of Geriş

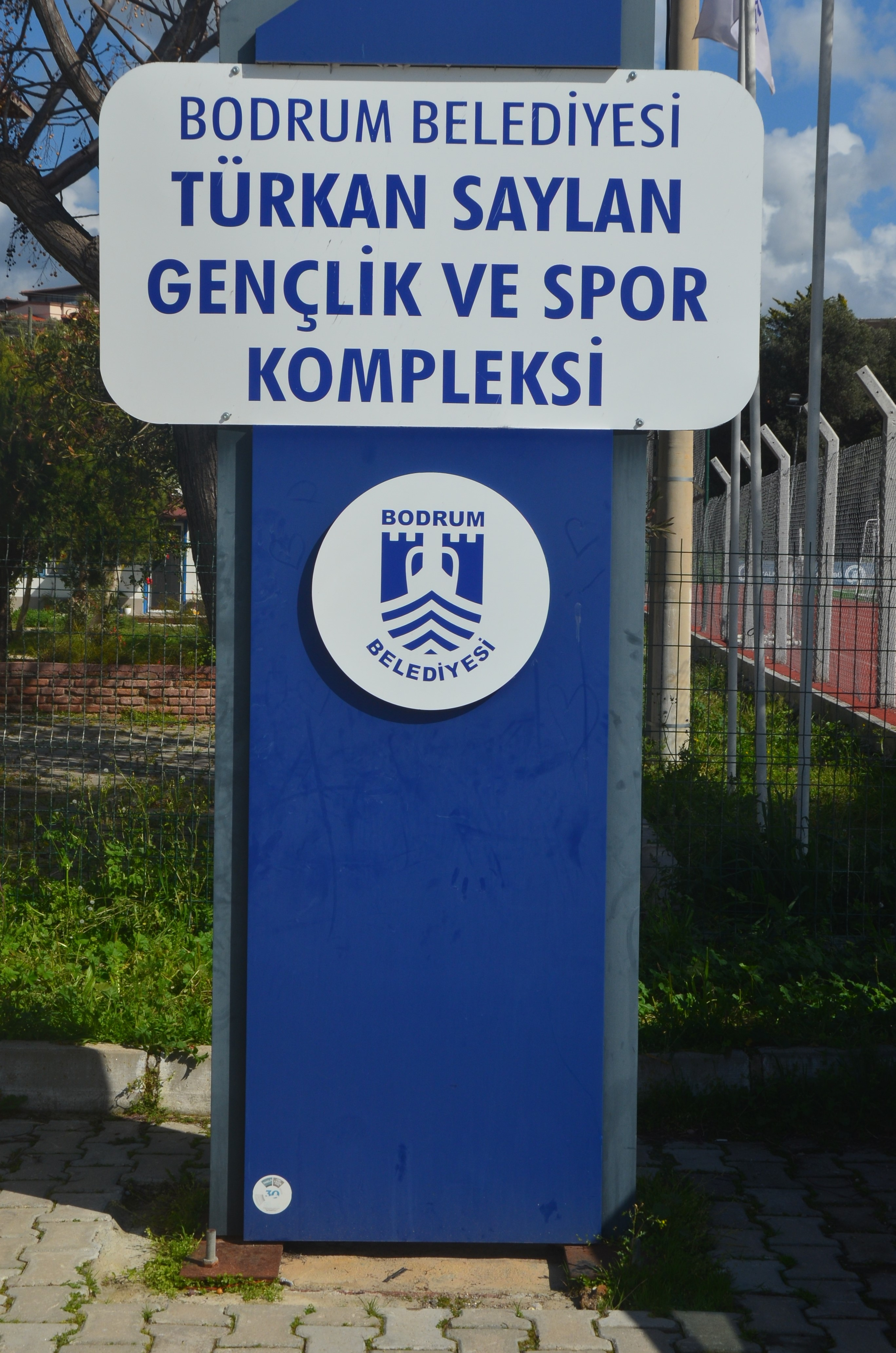
Türkan Saylan Sports Complex

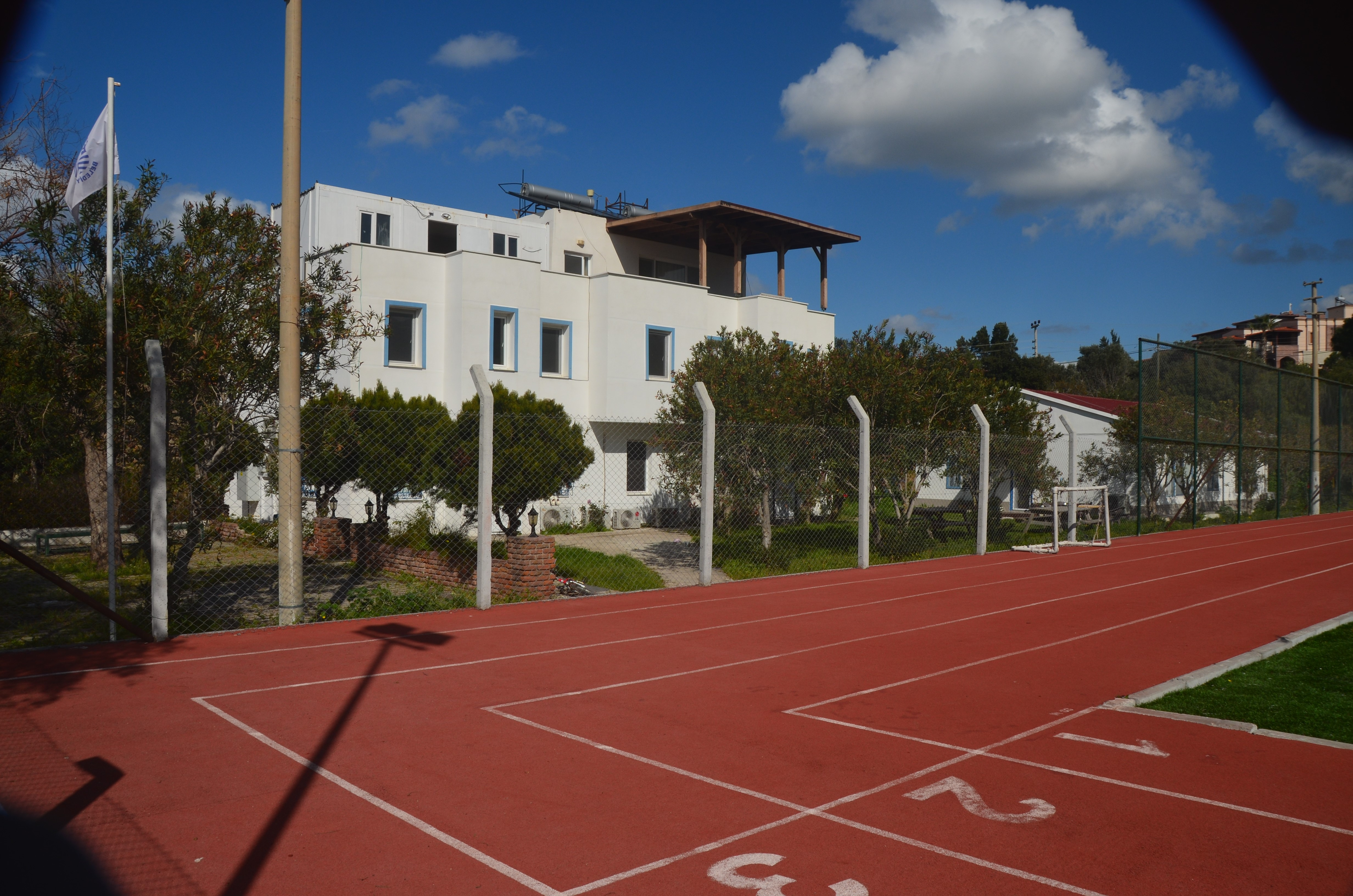
Club office of Yalıkavak SK at the Türkan Saylan Sports Complex

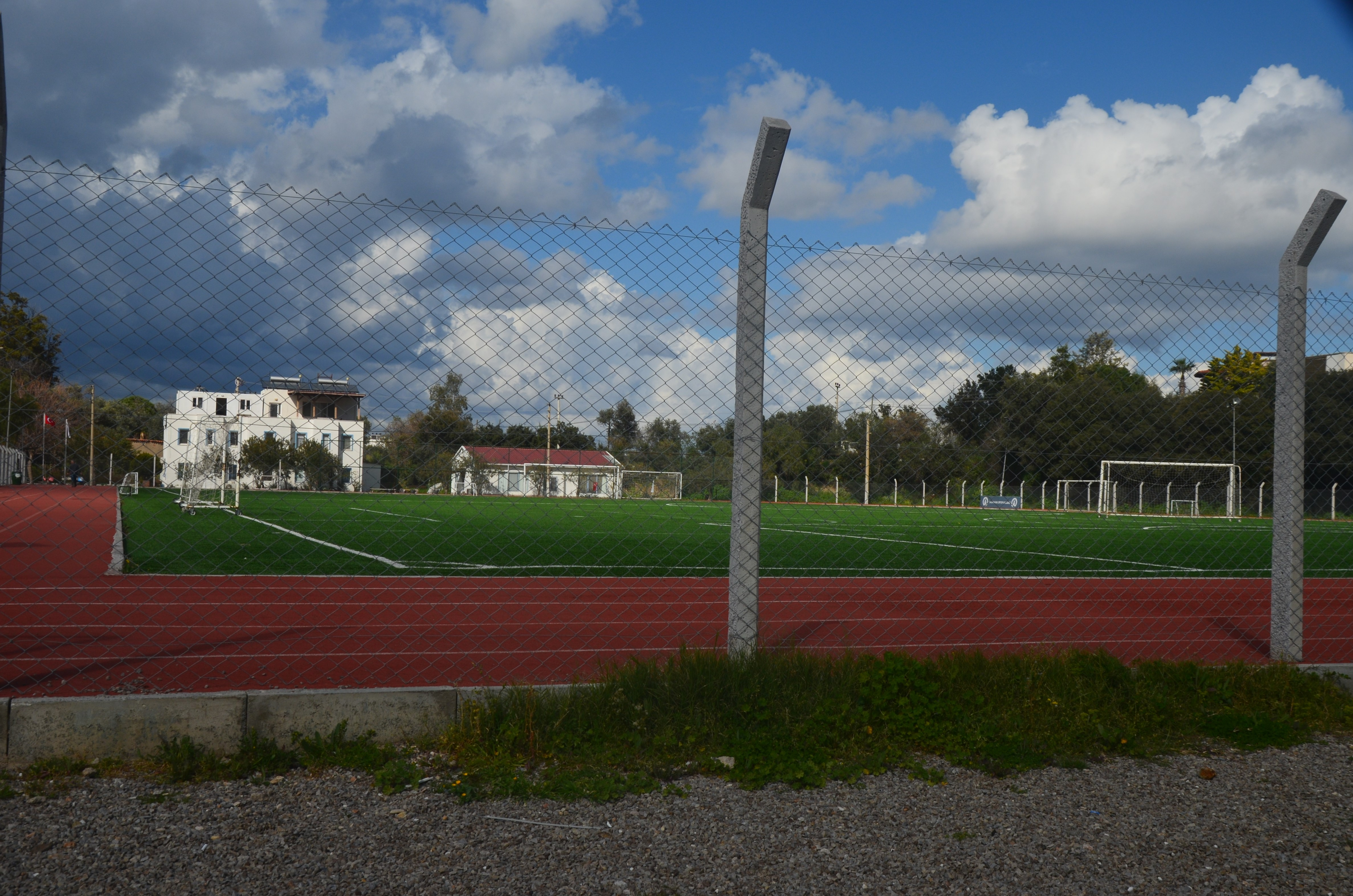
Football field at the Türkan Saylan Sports Complex

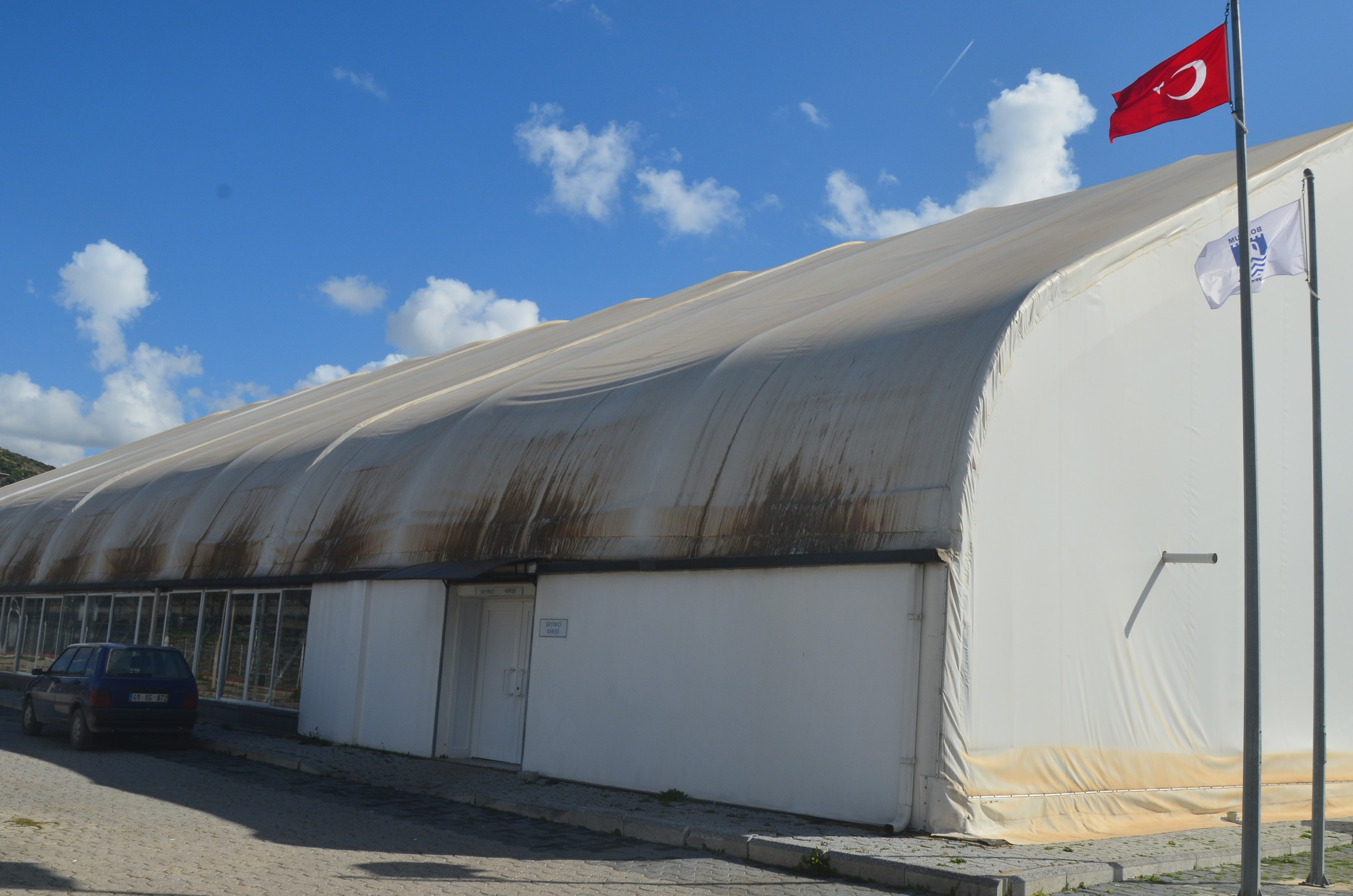
Sports hall at the Türkan Saylan Sports Complex
