= Cumhuriyet, Bodrum =

Village in Turkey

Cumhuriyet
- Neighbourhood
- Location in Turkey Cumhuriyet (Turkey Aegean)
- Coordinates: 37°02′44″N 27°24′38″E
- Country: Turkey
- Province: Muğla
- District: Bodrum
- Population (2024): 2,329
- Time zone: UTC+3 (TRT)

Cumhuriyet is a neighbourhood in the municipality and district of Bodrum, Muğla Province, Turkey. Its population is 2,329 (2024).
