= Uranium (Caria) =

Classical polis in Aegean Turkey

Coordinates: 37°02′37″N 27°51′39″E

Uranium or Ouranion (Ancient Greek: Οὐράνιον) was a town of ancient Caria, on the Bodrum Peninsula. Uranium was a polis (city-state) and a member of the Delian League. Uranium appears in the Athenian tribute lists and paid an annual tribute of 17 drachmae, 1 obol.

Its site was associated with Burgaz, on a hill NW of Geriş village, Bodrum, Asiatic Turkey. Two Hellenistic inscriptions published in 1992, however, seem to place the city on Dikmendag, a coastal mountain about 7 km west of Ören.
