= Kumbahçe, Bodrum =

Village in Turkey

Kumbahçe
- Neighbourhood
- Location in Turkey Kumbahçe (Turkey Aegean)
- Coordinates: 37°01′45″N 27°26′34″E
- Country: Turkey
- Province: Muğla
- District: Bodrum
- Population (2024): 4,869
- Time zone: UTC+3 (TRT)

Kumbahçe is a neighbourhood in the municipality and district of Bodrum, Muğla Province, Turkey. Its population is 4,869 (2024).
