= Müskebi, Bodrum =

Village in Turkey

Müskebi
- Neighbourhood
- Location in Turkey Müskebi (Turkey Aegean)
- Coordinates: 37°02′53″N 27°20′51″E
- Country: Turkey
- Province: Muğla
- District: Bodrum
- Population (2024): 9,178
- Time zone: UTC+3 (TRT)

Müskebi is a neighbourhood in the municipality and district of Bodrum, Muğla Province, Turkey. Its population is 9,178 (2024).
