= Karabağ, Bodrum =

Village in Turkey

Karabağ
- Neighbourhood
- Coordinates
- Country: Turkey
- Province: Muğla
- District: Bodrum
- Population (2024): 7,328
- Time zone: UTC+3 (TRT)

Karabağ is a neighbourhood in the municipality and district of Bodrum, Muğla Province, Turkey. Its population is 7,328 (2024).
