= Gündoğan, Bodrum =

Town in Bodrum

Gündoğan
- Neighbourhood
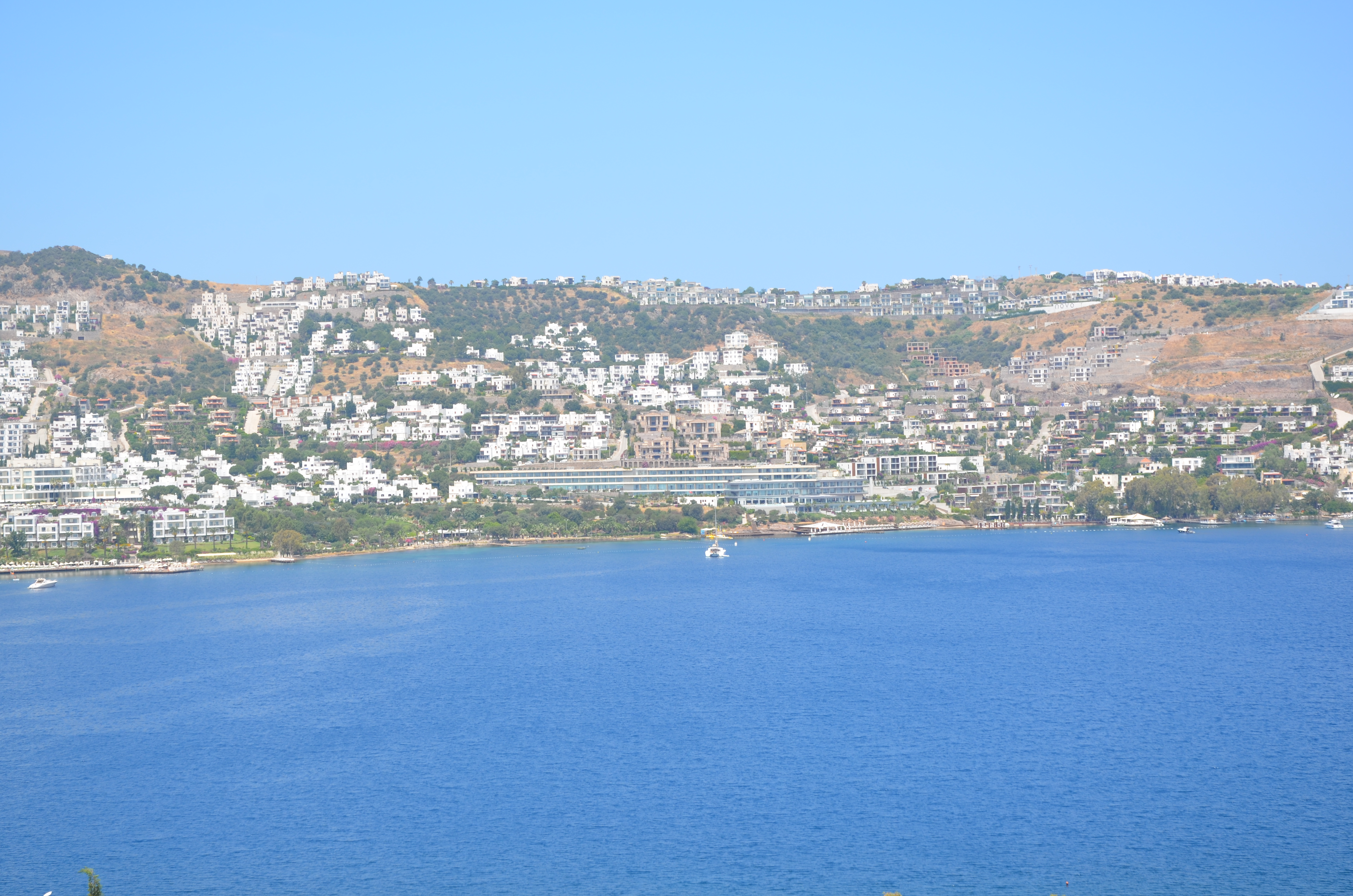

- Location within Turkey Location within Turkey Aegean
- Coordinates: 37°07′40″N 27°20′50″E
- Country: Turkey
- Province: Muğla
- District: Bodrum
- Population (2023): 4,306
- Time zone: UTC+3 (TRT)

Gündoğan is a neighbourhood of the municipality and district of Bodrum, Muğla Province, Turkey. Its population is 4,306 (2023). Before the 2013 reorganisation, it was a town (belde). It is a touristic settlement located between Yalıkavak and Türkbükü.

== History ==
Gündoğan's history begins before 4 BC. The original name for Gündoğan was Vera until it took the name of Farilya which means "the place where the sun rises". After 1961, the place started to be referred to as Gündoğan (translating to "day born", which means the name of the place has protected itself). Gündoğan has been under the control of the Persians, Egyptians, Greeks, Romans and Leleges.

== Tourism ==
Gündoğan is a relatively small town located in the Bodrum Peninsula, on the coast of the Aegean Sea. Touristic spots in Gündoğan:

- Graveyard stones from the Leleges
- Old windmills
- Water cisterns
- Peynir Çiçeği Cave
- Hasan Öldü Hill
- Elli İki Merdiven Church
- Aziz Apostol (St. Apostle) Church
- Ottoman Tower

=== Peynir Çiçeği Cave ===
The Peynir Çiçeği Cave is one of the greatest natural formations in Bodrum. There have been artifacts found from the Copper and Bronze Ages. Peynir Çiçeği Cave is translated literally as "Cheese Flower Cave". The name is derived from people is ancient times using the dripping liquid as rennet.
