= Yokuşbaşı, Bodrum =

Village in Turkey

Yokuşbaşı
- Neighbourhood
- Country: Turkey
- Province: Muğla
- District: Bodrum
- Population (2024): 3,970
- Time zone: UTC+3 (TRT)

Yokuşbaşı is a neighbourhood in the municipality and district of Bodrum, Muğla Province, Turkey. Its population is 3,970 (2024).
