= Konacık =

- Neighbourhood
- Location in Turkey Konacık (Turkey Aegean)
- Coordinates: 37°03′N 27°24′E
- Country: Turkey
- Province: Muğla
- District: Bodrum
- Elevation: 85 m (279 ft)
- Population (2022): 5,344
- Time zone: UTC+3 (TRT)
- Postal code: 48400
- Area code: 0252

Konacık is a neighbourhood of the municipality and district of Bodrum, Muğla Province, Turkey. Its population is 5,344 (2022). Before the 2013 reorganisation, it was a town (belde). The town is almost merged to Bodrum to the south east. Konacık was an ancient settlement named Pedesa meaning pathway in Luwian language (a language spoken in Anatolia before the 10th century BC.) Konacık was declared a seat of township in 1999.
