= Çarşı, Bodrum =

Village in Turkey

Çarşı
- Neighbourhood
- Coordinates
- Country: Turkey
- Province: Muğla
- District: Bodrum
- Population (2024): 2,912
- Time zone: UTC+3 (TRT)

Çarşı is a neighbourhood in the municipality and district of Bodrum, Muğla Province, Turkey. Its population is 2,912 (2024).
