= Eskiçeşme, Bodrum =

Village in Turkey

Eskiçeşme
- Neighbourhood
- Country: Turkey
- Province: Muğla
- District: Bodrum
- Population (2024): 4,883
- Time zone: UTC+3 (TRT)

Eskiçeşme is a neighbourhood in the municipality and district of Bodrum, Muğla Province, Turkey. Its population is 4,883 (2024).
