= Akçaalan, Bodrum =

Village in Turkey

Akçaalan
- Neighbourhood
- Location in Turkey Akçaalan (Turkey Aegean)
- Coordinates: 37°0′49″N 27°16′37″E
- Country: Turkey
- Province: Muğla
- District: Bodrum
- Population (2024): 9,408
- Time zone: UTC+3 (TRT)

Akçaalan is a neighbourhood in the municipality and district of Bodrum, Muğla Province, Turkey. Its population is 9,408 (2024).
