= Bitez =

Bitez Agacli
- Neighbourhood
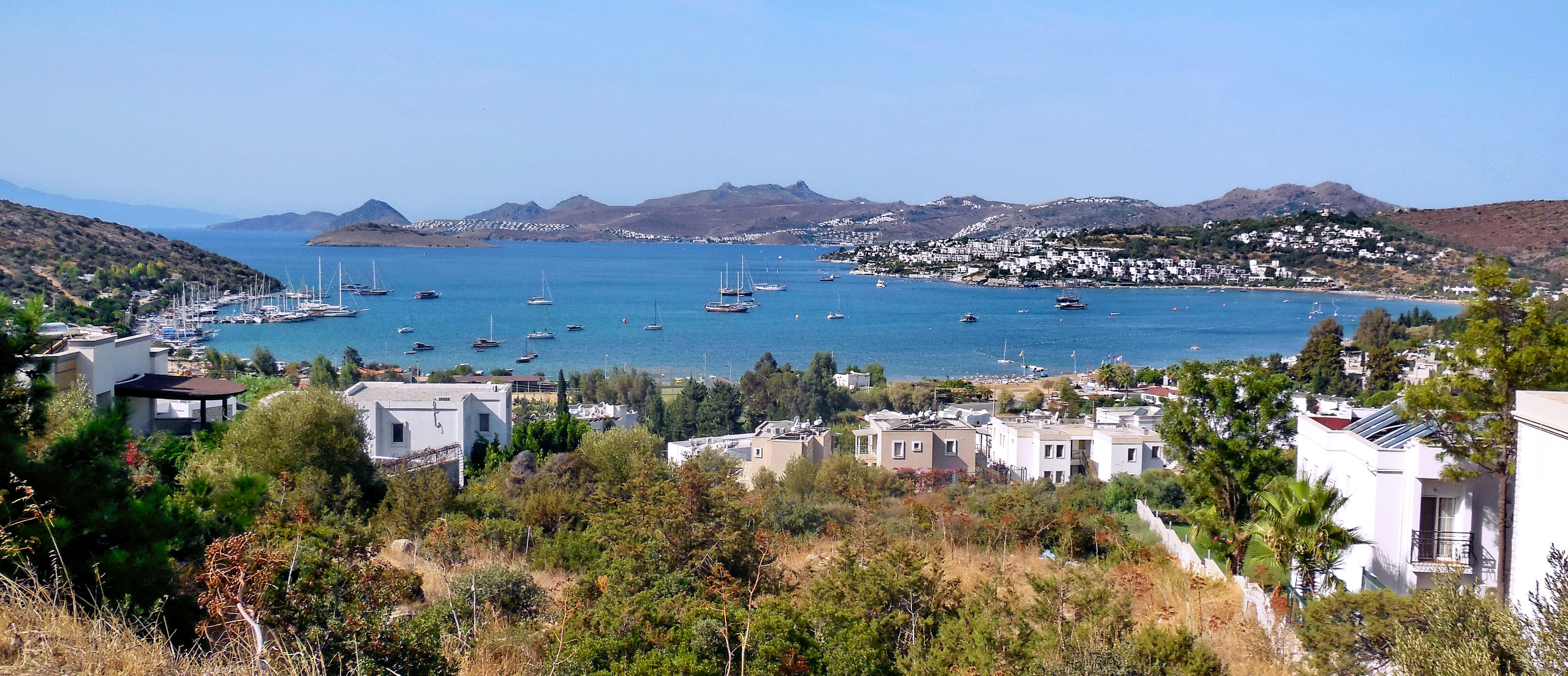

- Location within Turkey Location within Turkey Aegean
- Coordinates: 37°02′N 27°23′E
- Country: Turkey
- Province: Muğla
- District: Bodrum
- Elevation: 25 m (82 ft)
- Population (2022): 11,048
- Time zone: UTC+3 (TRT)
- Postal code: 48400
- Area code: 0252

Bitez is a neighbourhood of the municipality and district of Bodrum, Muğla Province, Turkey. Its population is 11,048 (2022). Before the 2013 reorganisation, it was a town (belde).

== Geography ==
It is situated in Bodrum Peninsula. It is almost merged with Bodrum which is just 4 kilometres (2.5 mi) east of Bitez. It is a coastal town and a popular summer resort. During the summer months the population is much higher.

== Economy ==
The climate in Bitez is suitable for all Mediterranean agricultural crops like olive, citrus, tobacco, etc. In the past fishing was also a part of the town economy. But at the present, the main economic activity is tourism. There are many hotels and restaurants in addition to blue flag beaches in Bitez which are mainly active during summers.

== Bitez in popular culture ==
Bitez is famous for a popular song named Çökertme composed in the early years of the 20th century. There are two versions of the event upon which the lyrics refer to. But in both versions, the main theme is the struggle against Regie Company founded for Ottoman Public Debt Administration which controlled the tobacco trade in Turkey. The producers had no right to sell their own products. This gave rise to smuggler traffic and the smugglers began smuggling tobacco to Cos island of Greece (the distance to Cos island is only 15 kilometres (9.3 mi)). According to lyrics, Bodrum governor (so called Circassian governor, Çerkez kaymakam) arrested two smugglers named Halil Efe and İpram Efe in Bitez shore (Turkish: Bitez yalısı) and then executed them without trial. In another version of the story Halil Efe and his sweetheart were trying to escape to Cos island when they were arrested. The governor was furious because he had an eye on Halil’s sweetheart Çakır Gülsüm (Güssüm)
