= Çırkan, Bodrum =

Village in Turkey

Çırkan
- Neighbourhood
- Location in Turkey Çırkan (Turkey Aegean)
- Coordinates: 37°02′52″N 27°24′17″E
- Country: Turkey
- Province: Muğla
- District: Bodrum
- Population (2024): 12,409
- Time zone: UTC+3 (TRT)

Çırkan is a neighbourhood in the municipality and district of Bodrum, Muğla Province, Turkey. Its population is 12,409 (2024).
