= Farilya, Bodrum =

Village in Turkey

Farilya
- Neighbourhood
- Location in Turkey Farilya (Turkey Aegean)
- Coordinates: 37°06′57″N 27°20′51″E
- Country: Turkey
- Province: Muğla
- District: Bodrum
- Population (2024): 3,378
- Time zone: UTC+3 (TRT)

Farilya is a neighbourhood in the municipality and district of Bodrum, Muğla Province, Turkey. Its population is 3,378 (2024).
