= Umurca, Bodrum =

Village in Turkey

Umurca
- Neighbourhood
- Coordinates
- Country: Turkey
- Province: Muğla
- District: Bodrum
- Population (2024): 5,670
- Time zone: UTC+3 (TRT)

Umurca is a neighbourhood in the municipality and district of Bodrum, Muğla Province, Turkey. Its population is 5,670 (2024).
