= Gölbaşı, Bodrum =

Village in Turkey

Gölbaşı
- Neighbourhood
- Coordinates
- Country: Turkey
- Province: Muğla
- District: Bodrum
- Population (2024): 3,275
- Time zone: UTC+3 (TRT)

Gölbaşı is a neighbourhood in the municipality and district of Bodrum, Muğla Province, Turkey. Its population is 3,275 (2024).
