= Peksimet, Bodrum =

Peksimet
- Neighbourhood
- Location in Turkey Peksimet (Turkey Aegean)
- Coordinates: 37°02′29″N 27°16′30″E
- Country: Turkey
- Province: Muğla
- District: Bodrum
- Population (2022): 2,575
- Time zone: UTC+3 (TRT)

Peksimet is a neighbourhood of the municipality and district of Bodrum, Muğla Province, Turkey. Its population is 2,575 (2022). It is an inland village on the Bodrum Peninsula. It is 7 km from Turgutreis. Its neighbour village is Dereköy.

It is easy to drive through Peksimet without realizing it, but every driver can recognize the location of this village, thanks to a group of windmills on the hill.

== History ==
Peksimet is also the Turkish word for twice-baked bread (similar to a hard rusk), and Peksimet got its name because the villagers supplied this bread to Turkish soldiers during the Turkish War of Independence (1919–1923), and the locals became known for its baking.
