= Koyunbaba, Bodrum =

Village in Turkey

Koyunbaba
- Neighbourhood
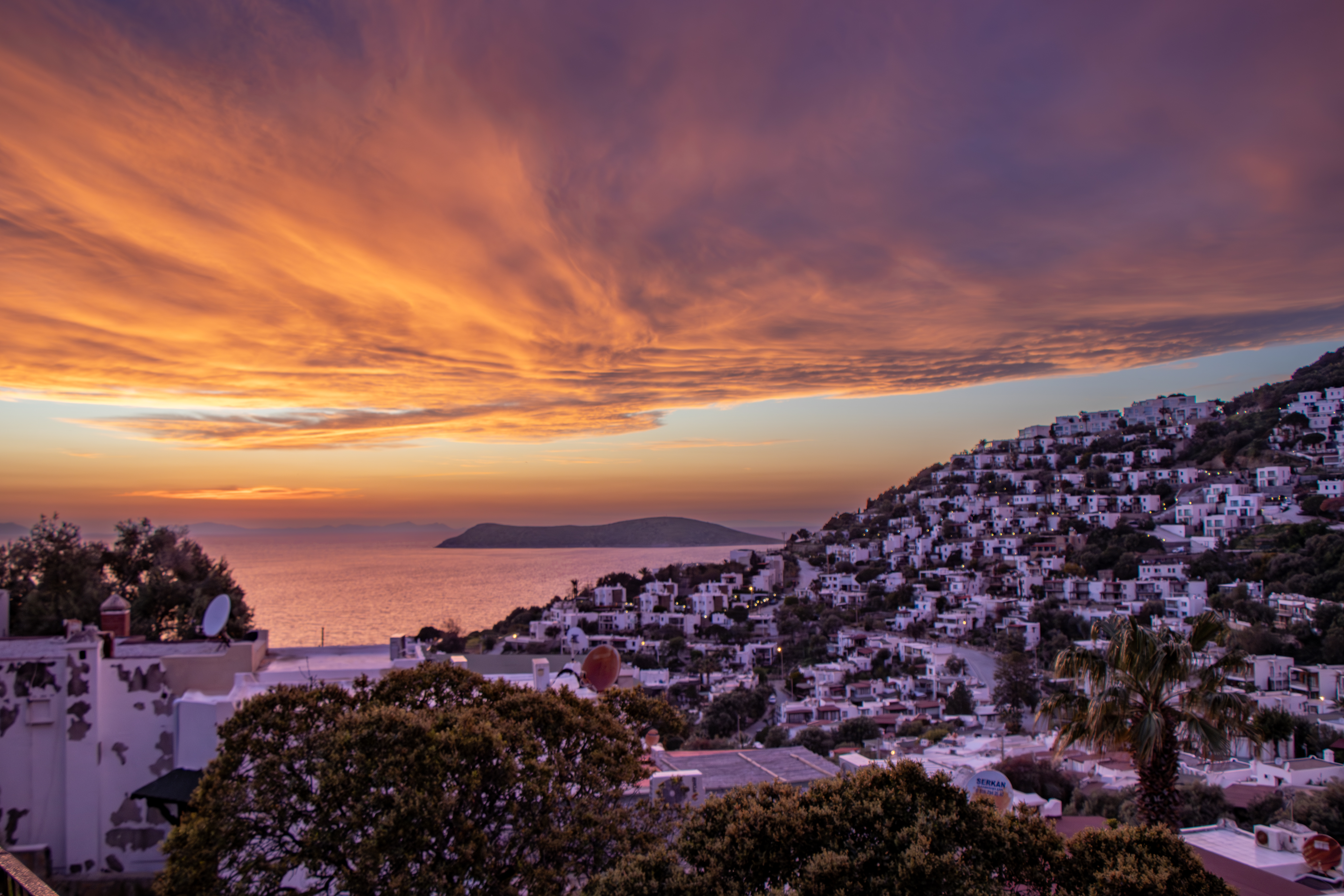
- Sunset over Koyunbaba, Bodrum
- Country: Turkey
- Province: Muğla
- District: Bodrum
- Population (2024): 2,794
- Time zone: UTC+3 (TRT)

Koyunbaba is a neighbourhood in the municipality and district of Bodrum, Muğla Province, Turkey. Its population is 2,794 (2024).
