= Bodrum =

Bodrum Halicarnassus
- District and municipality
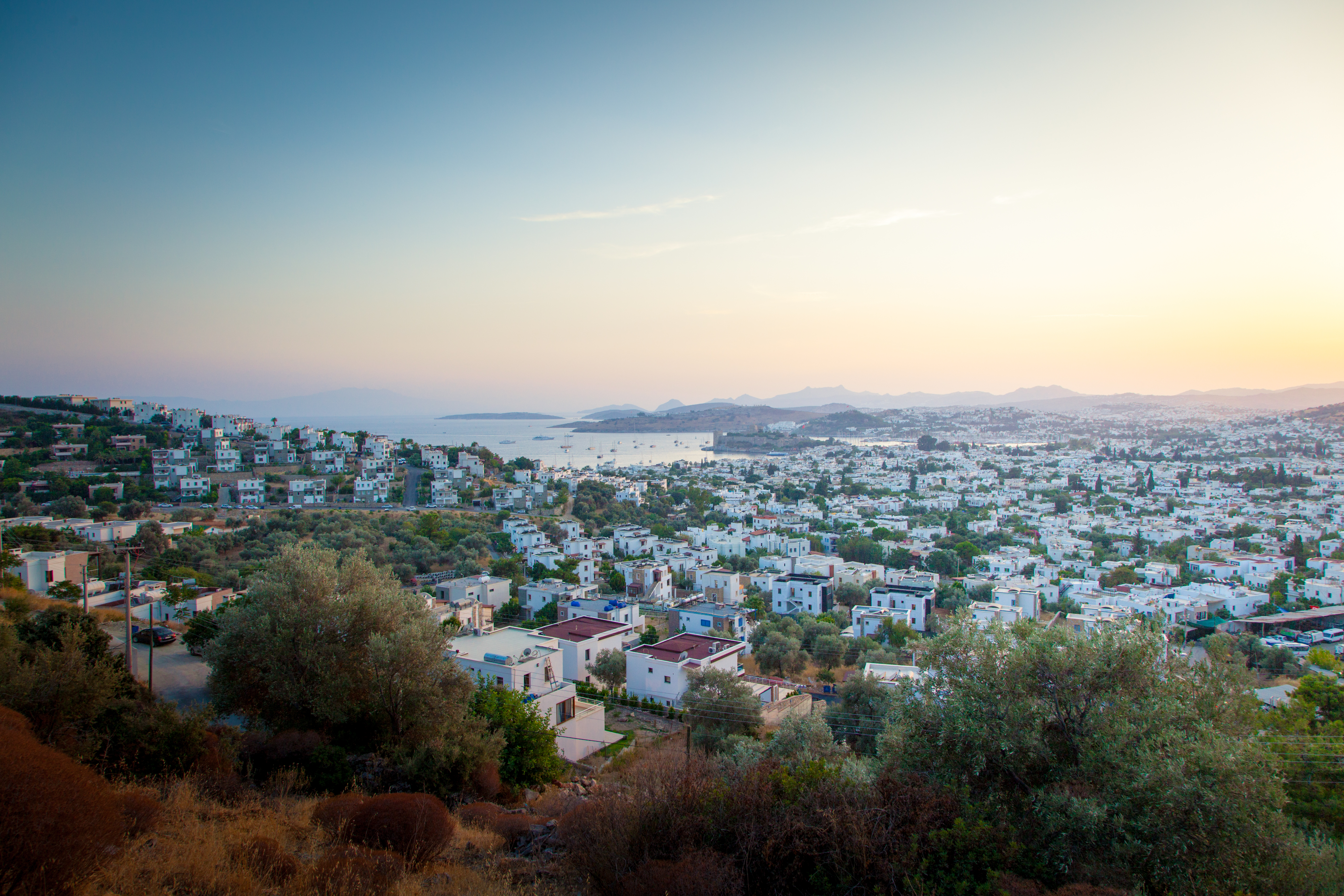
- View of Bodrum harbour

- Logo

- Map showing Bodrum District in Muğla Province

- Location within Turkey Location within Turkey Aegean
- Coordinates: 37°02′N 27°26′E
- Country: Turkey
- Province: Muğla

Government
  - Mayor: Tamer Mandalinci (CHP)
- Area: 650 km^{2} (250 sq mi)
- Population (2023): 198,335
  - Density: 310/km^{2} (790/sq mi)
- Time zone: UTC+3 (TRT)
- Postal code: 48400
- Area code: 0252
- Website: www.bodrum.bel.tr

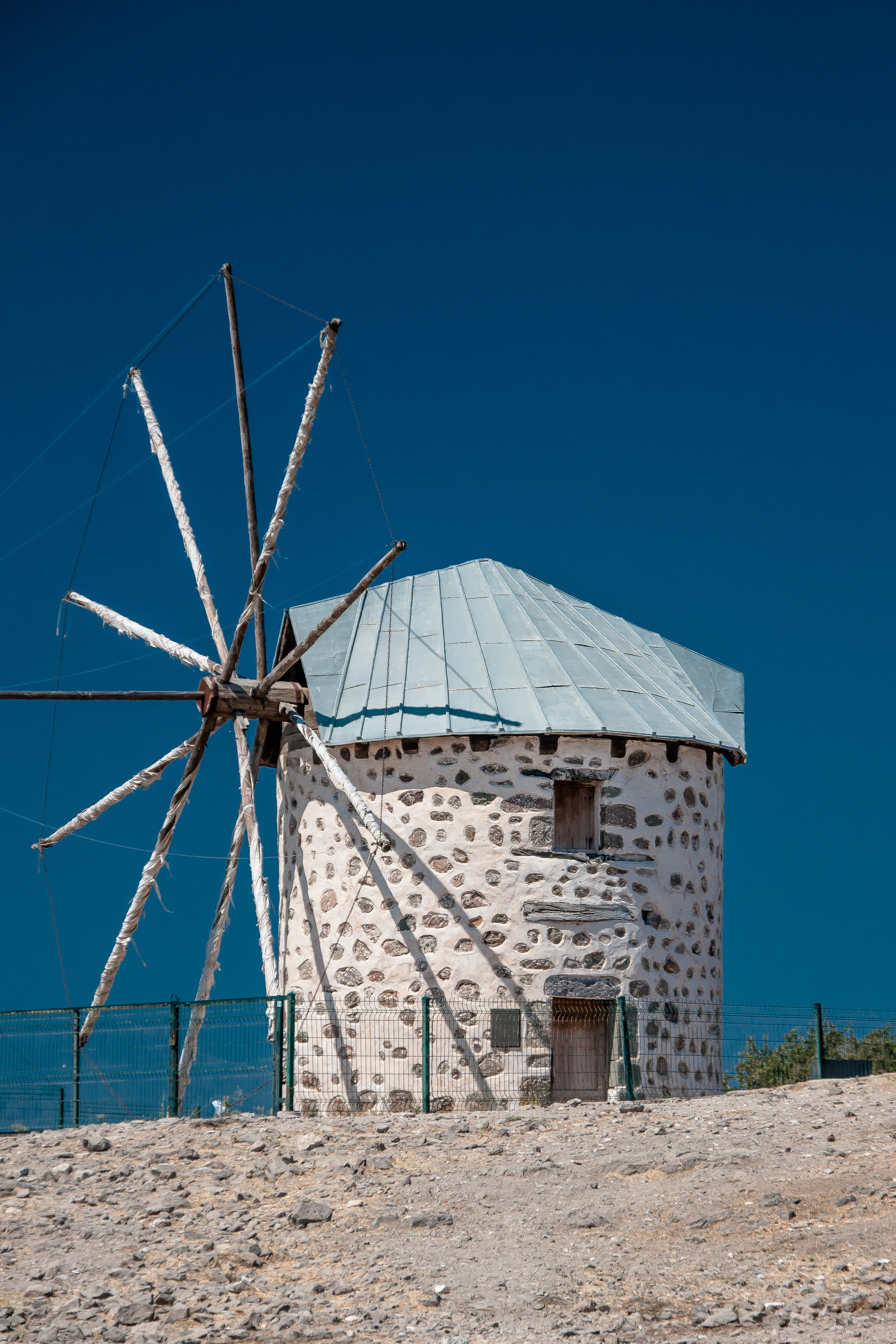
A white-washed windmill in Bodrum

Bodrum (Turkish pronunciation: [ˈbodɾum]) is a town and district of Muğla Province in Turkey. It is a port town at the entrance to the Gulf of Gökova. Known in ancient times as Halicarnassus (Greek: Αλικαρνασσός), the town was once home to the Mausoleum at Halicarnassus, also known as the tomb of Mausolus, one of the Seven Wonders of the Ancient World.

The town was founded by Dorian Greeks. It later fell under Persian rule and became the capital of the satrapy of Caria. Mausolus ruled Caria from here, and after his death in 353 BC, his wife Artemisia built a tomb, called the Mausoleum, for him. Macedonian forces laid siege to the city and captured it in 334 BC. After Alexander's death, the city passed to successive Hellenistic rulers and was briefly an independent kingdom until 129 BC, when it came under Roman rule. A series of natural disasters and repeated pirate attacks wreaked havoc on the area, and the city lost its importance by the time of the Byzantine era. The Knights Hospitaller arrived in 1402 and used the remains of the Mausoleum as a quarry to build Bodrum Castle. After the conquest of Rhodes by Suleiman the Magnificent in 1522, the town fell under Ottoman control as the Knights Hospitaller relocated to Europe.

By the 20th century, the town's economy was mainly based on fishing and sponge diving, but tourism has become the main industry in Bodrum since the late 20th century. The abundance of visitors has also contributed to Bodrum's retail and service industry. Milas–Bodrum Airport and Kos International Airport are the main airports that serve the town. The port has ferries to other nearby Turkish and Greek ports and islands, Kos being the most important. Most of the public transportation in the town is based on local share taxis and buses.

== Etymology ==
The modern name Bodrum derives from the town's medieval name Petronium, which has its roots in the Hospitaller Castle of St. Peter.

In classical antiquity, Bodrum was known as Halicarnassus (Ancient Greek: Ἁλικαρνασσός, Turkish: Halikarnas), a major city in ancient Caria. The suffix -ασσός (-assos) of Greek Ἁλικαρνᾱσσός is indicative of a substrate toponym, meaning that an original non-Greek name influenced or established the place's name. It has been proposed that the -καρνασσός (-karnassos) part is cognate with Luwian word "ha+ra/i-na-sà", which means fortress. If so, the city's ancient name was probably borrowed from Carian, a Luwic language native to pre-Greek Western Anatolia. The Carian name for Halicarnassus has been tentatively identified with 𐊠𐊣𐊫𐊰 𐊴𐊠𐊥𐊵𐊫𐊰 (alos k̂arnos) in inscriptions.

== History ==
=== Ancient era ===
Halicarnassus (Ancient Greek: Ἁλικαρνᾱσσός, romanized: Halikarnassós, or Ἀλικαρνασσός Alikarnassós; Turkish: Halikarnas), was an ancient Greek city at the site of modern Bodrum in Turkey. Halicarnassus was founded by Dorian Greeks, and the figures on its coins, such as the head of Medusa, Athena, Poseidon, and the trident, support the statement that the mother cities were Troezen and Argos. The inhabitants appear to have accepted Anthes, a son of Poseidon, as their legendary founder, as mentioned by Strabo, and were proud of the title Antheadae. The Carian name for Halicarnassus has been tentatively identified with Alosδkarnosδ in inscriptions.

In an early period, Halicarnassus was a member of the Doric Hexapolis, which included Kos, Cnidus, Lindos, Kameiros, and Ialysus, but it was expelled from the league when one of its citizens, Agasicles, took home the prize tripod that he had won in the Triopian games instead of dedicating it according to custom to the Triopian Apollo. In the early 5th century, Halicarnassus was under the sway of Artemisia I of Caria (also known as Artemesia of Halicarnassus), who made herself famous as a naval commander at the battle of Salamis. Little is known of Pisindalis, her son and successor; but Lygdamis, the tyrant of Halicarnassus, who next attained power, is notorious for having the poet Panyasis put to death and forcing Herodotus, possibly the most well-known Halicarnassian, to leave his native city (c. 457 BC).

=== Persian rule ===
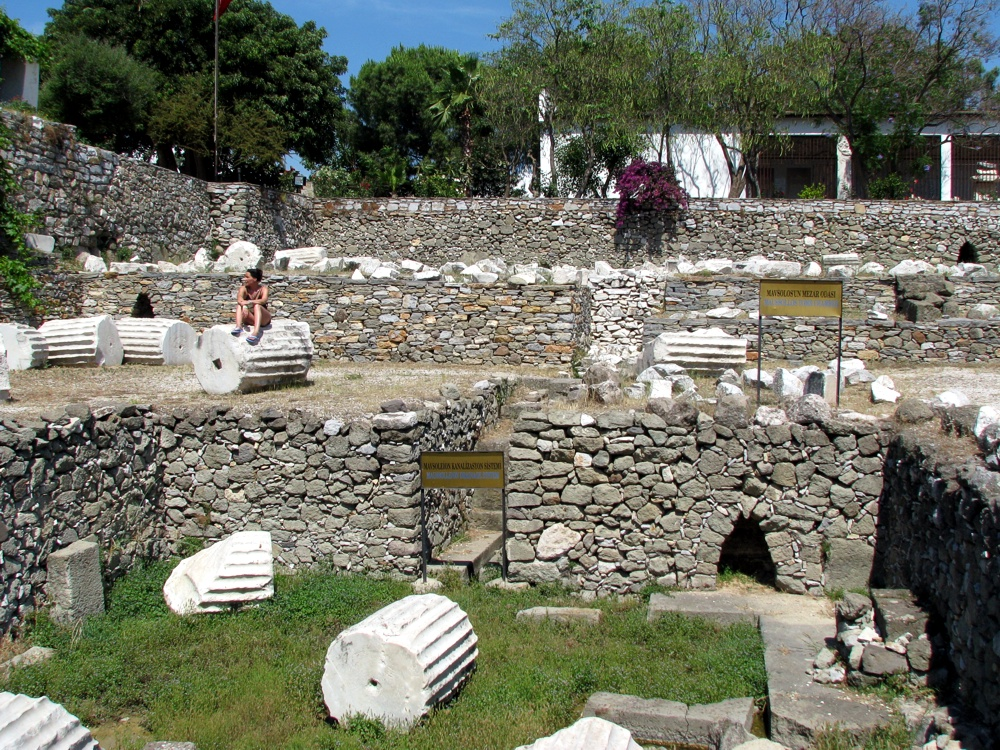
Surviving substructures and ruins of the Mausoleum, one of the Seven Wonders of the Ancient World.

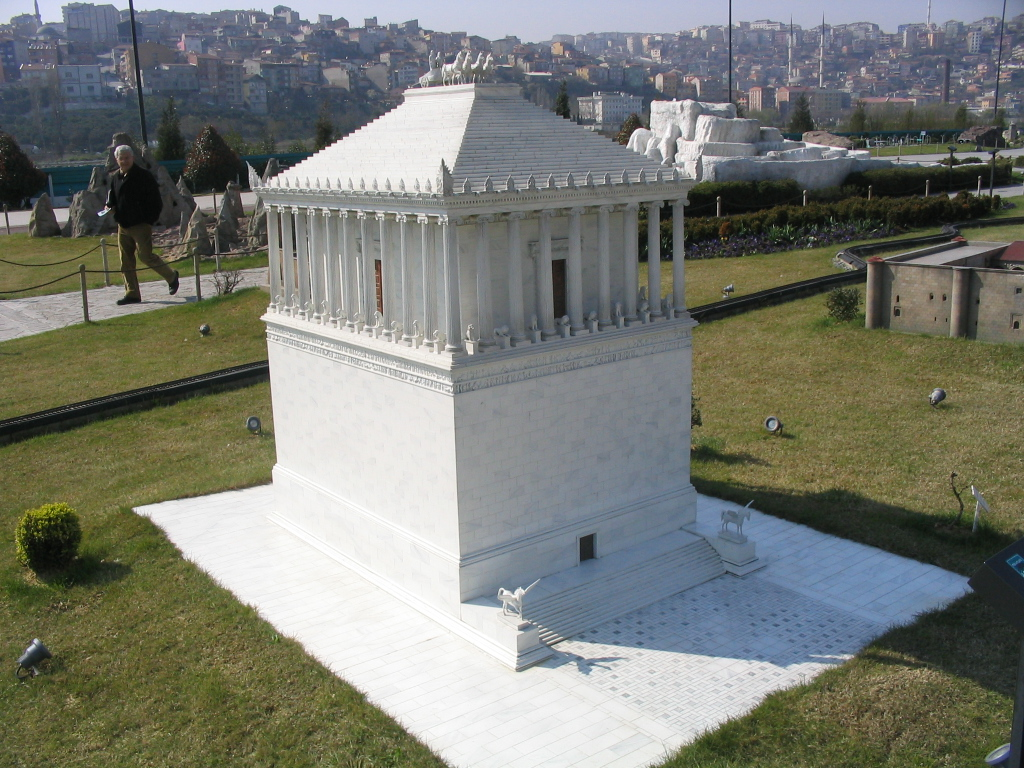
Replica model of the Mausoleum at Miniatürk, Istanbul

The city later fell under Persian rule. Under the Persians, it was the capital city of the satrapy of Caria, the region that long afterward constituted its hinterland and of which it was the principal port. Its strategic location ensured that the city enjoyed considerable autonomy. Archaeological evidence from the period, such as the recently discovered Salmakis (Kaplankalesi) Inscription, now in Bodrum Museum of Underwater Archaeology, attests to the particular pride its inhabitants had developed.

Mausolus ruled Caria from here, nominally on behalf of the Persians but practically independently, for much of his reign from 377 to 353 BC. When he died in 353 BC, Artemisia II of Caria, who was both his sister and his widow, employed the ancient Greek architects Satyros, Pythis, and the sculptors Bryaxis, Scopas, Leochares, and Timotheus to build a monument and a tomb, known as Mausoleum at Halicarnassus, for him. The word "mausoleum" derives from the structure of this tomb. It was a temple-like structure decorated with reliefs and statuary on a massive base. Today only the foundations and a few pieces of sculpture remain.

=== Hellenistic and Roman periods ===
Alexander the Great laid siege to the city after his arrival in the Carian lands and together with his ally, Queen Ada of Caria, captured it after fighting in 334 BC. After Alexander's death, the rule of the city passed to Antigonus I (311 BC), Lysimachus (after 301 BC), and the Ptolemies (281–197 BC) and was briefly an independent kingdom until 129 BC, when it came under Roman rule. A series of earthquakes destroyed much of the city, as well as the great Mausoleum, while repeated pirate attacks from the Mediterranean wreaked further havoc on the area. By the time of the early Christian Byzantine era, when Halicarnassus was an important bishopric, there was little left of the shining city of Mausolus.

=== Medieval era ===
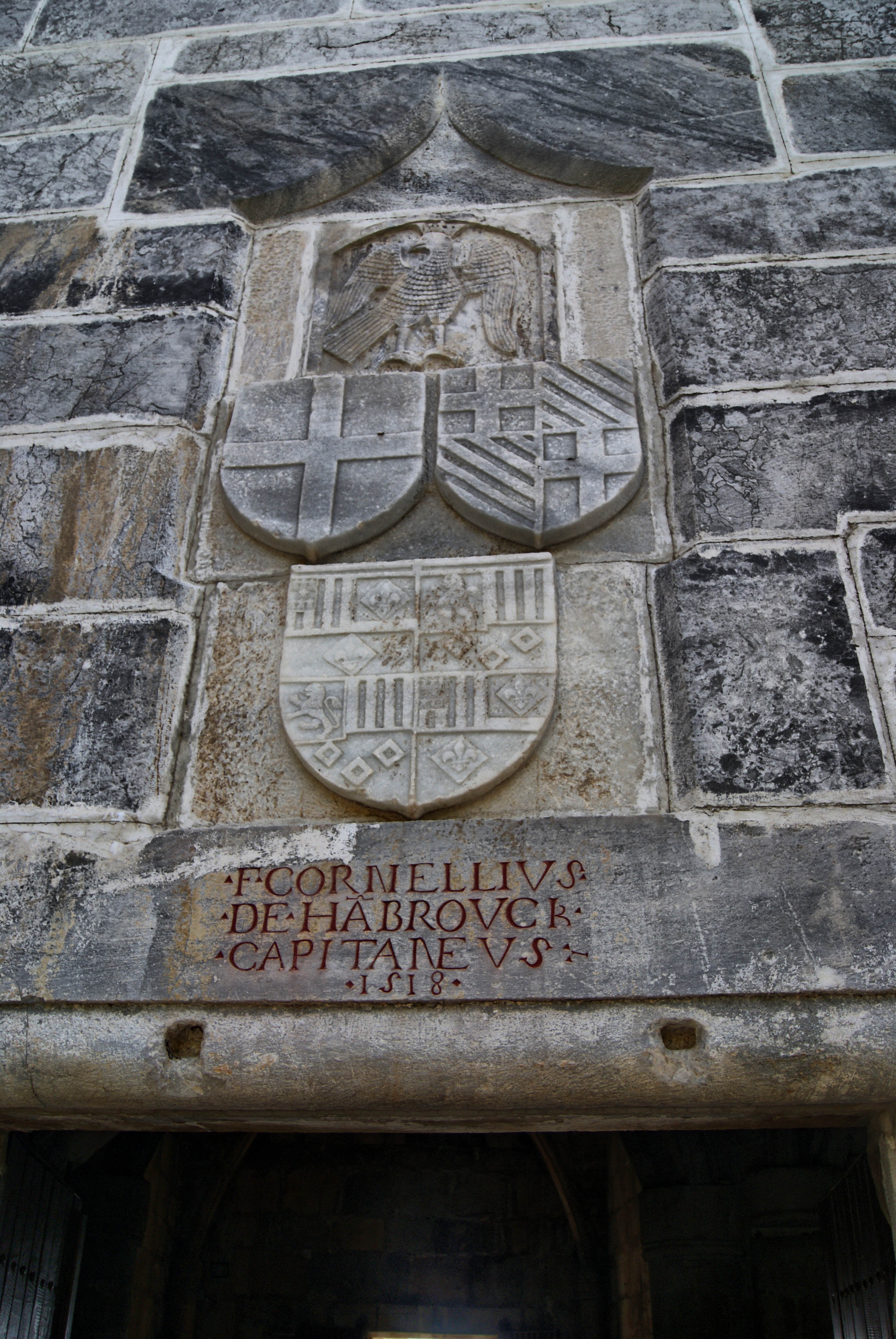
Bodrum Castle coat of arms

Crusader Knights arrived in 1402 and used the remains of the Mausoleum as a quarry to build the still impressively standing Bodrum Castle (Castle of Saint Peter), a well-preserved example of late Crusader architecture in the eastern Mediterranean.

In 1522, Suleiman the Magnificent conquered the base of the Crusader knights on the island of Rhodes, who then relocated first briefly to Sicily and later permanently to Malta, leaving the Castle of Saint Peter and Bodrum to the Ottoman Empire.

=== Modern era ===
Bodrum was a quiet town of fishermen and sponge divers until the early 20th century. From 1867 until 1922, it was part of the Aidin Vilayet of the Ottoman Empire. In the 1923 population exchange, the Greeks of Bodrum settled in Nea Alikarnassos, Crete in exchange for Muslims of Crete and Greek Muslims. In her book Bodrum, Fatma Mansur points out that the presence of a large community of bilingual Cretan Turks, coupled with the conditions of free trade and access to the southern Dodecanese islands until 1935, made the town less provincial. The fact that traditional agriculture was not a very rewarding activity in the rather dry peninsula also prevented the formation of a class of large landowners. Bodrum has no notable history of political or religious extremism. A first nucleus of intellectuals started to form after the 1950s around the writer Cevat Şakir Kabaağaçlı, who first came here in exile two decades previously and was charmed by the town to the point of adopting the pen name Halikarnas Balıkçısı ('The Fisherman of Halicarnassus').

== Geography ==
=== Climate ===
Bodrum has a hot summer Mediterranean climate (Csa in the Köppen climate classification and Cshl in the Trewartha climate classification). The average temperature is around 15 °C (59 °F) in winter and 34 °C (93 °F) in summer, with many sunny spells. Summers are very hot and mostly sunny, and winters are mild and humid. As of 2019 the record high was 46.8 °C (116.2 °F) in July 2017.

Climate data for Bodrum (1991–2020)
Month	Jan	Feb	Mar	Apr	May	Jun	Jul	Aug	Sep	Oct	Nov	Dec	Year
Mean daily maximum °C (°F)	15.5 (59.9)	16.0 (60.8)	18.3 (64.9)	21.7 (71.1)	26.6 (79.9)	32.1 (89.8)	35.2 (95.4)	35.3 (95.5)	31.2 (88.2)	26.4 (79.5)	21.2 (70.2)	17.0 (62.6)	24.8 (76.6)
Daily mean °C (°F)	11.5 (52.7)	12.0 (53.6)	13.9 (57.0)	17.0 (62.6)	21.3 (70.3)	26.2 (79.2)	29.0 (84.2)	29.0 (84.2)	25.4 (77.7)	21.2 (70.2)	16.7 (62.1)	13.1 (55.6)	19.7 (67.5)
Mean daily minimum °C (°F)	8.5 (47.3)	8.8 (47.8)	10.3 (50.5)	13.1 (55.6)	17.2 (63.0)	21.6 (70.9)	24.1 (75.4)	24.4 (75.9)	21.2 (70.2)	17.5 (63.5)	13.3 (55.9)	10.1 (50.2)	15.9 (60.6)
Average precipitation mm (inches)	138.3 (5.44)	108.2 (4.26)	70.2 (2.76)	43.7 (1.72)	19.6 (0.77)	1.9 (0.07)	0.1 (0.00)	0.4 (0.02)	19.4 (0.76)	49.4 (1.94)	99.9 (3.93)	150.0 (5.91)	701.1 (27.60)
Average precipitation days (≥ 1.0 mm)	10.3	8.8	6.6	5.0	2.8	1.6	1.0	1.0	2.1	4.0	6.1	10.4	59.7
Average relative humidity (%)	66.3	65.7	62.8	61.9	60.2	52.9	49.8	52.6	56.0	62.2	65.5	68.1	60.3
Mean monthly sunshine hours	148.5	148.8	197.4	232.5	266.1	300.3	320.7	315.5	267.6	224.2	176.0	140.0	2,737.5
Source: NOAA

Climate data for Bodrum (1970-2011)
Month	Jan	Feb	Mar	Apr	May	Jun	Jul	Aug	Sep	Oct	Nov	Dec	Year
Record high °C (°F)	23.1 (73.6)	24.0 (75.2)	28.7 (83.7)	30.8 (87.4)	39.0 (102.2)	42.3 (108.1)	46.8 (116.2)	45.0 (113.0)	39.8 (103.6)	38.9 (102.0)	31.0 (87.8)	24.5 (76.1)	46.8 (116.2)
Mean daily maximum °C (°F)	15.2 (59.4)	15.2 (59.4)	17.6 (63.7)	21.1 (70.0)	26.0 (78.8)	31.2 (88.2)	34.2 (93.6)	34.0 (93.2)	30.3 (86.5)	25.6 (78.1)	20.3 (68.5)	16.5 (61.7)	23.9 (75.1)
Daily mean °C (°F)	11.4 (52.5)	11.3 (52.3)	13.2 (55.8)	16.4 (61.5)	20.9 (69.6)	25.7 (78.3)	28.3 (82.9)	28.0 (82.4)	24.5 (76.1)	20.3 (68.5)	15.8 (60.4)	12.7 (54.9)	19.0 (66.3)
Mean daily minimum °C (°F)	8.3 (46.9)	8.1 (46.6)	9.7 (49.5)	12.7 (54.9)	16.5 (61.7)	20.8 (69.4)	23.3 (73.9)	23.3 (73.9)	20.3 (68.5)	16.8 (62.2)	12.8 (55.0)	9.8 (49.6)	15.2 (59.3)
Record low °C (°F)	−1.6 (29.1)	−4.5 (23.9)	−1.8 (28.8)	2.8 (37.0)	8.0 (46.4)	12.6 (54.7)	16 (61)	18.5 (65.3)	10.8 (51.4)	7.8 (46.0)	2.0 (35.6)	0.2 (32.4)	−4.5 (23.9)
Average precipitation mm (inches)	134.1 (5.28)	107.9 (4.25)	74.0 (2.91)	39.1 (1.54)	18.4 (0.72)	7.5 (0.30)	1.3 (0.05)	8.5 (0.33)	20.8 (0.82)	40.5 (1.59)	97.7 (3.85)	156.2 (6.15)	706 (27.79)
Average rainy days	12.3	11.2	8.5	6.9	3.7	2.1	1.5	1.0	2.8	5.3	8.8	13.2	77.3
Mean monthly sunshine hours	148.8	151.2	198.4	225	285.2	318	337.9	322.4	273	223.2	168	139.5	2,790.6
Source: Devlet Meteoroloji İşleri Genel Müdürlüğü

Climate data for water temperatures in Bodrum
Month	Jan	Feb	Mar	Apr	May	Jun	Jul	Aug	Sep	Oct	Nov	Dec	Year
Mean daily maximum °C (°F)	18.5 (65.3)	17.0 (62.6)	16.6 (61.9)	18.2 (64.8)	21.0 (69.8)	24.5 (76.1)	26.8 (80.2)	27.4 (81.3)	26.8 (80.2)	25.3 (77.5)	22.0 (71.6)	19.8 (67.6)	22.0 (71.6)
Mean daily minimum °C (°F)	15.2 (59.4)	14.9 (58.8)	15.2 (59.4)	15.3 (59.5)	17.6 (63.7)	21.0 (69.8)	23.1 (73.6)	24.5 (76.1)	23.7 (74.7)	20.0 (68.0)	17.2 (63.0)	15.7 (60.3)	18.6 (65.5)
Source: seatemperature.org

== Main sights ==
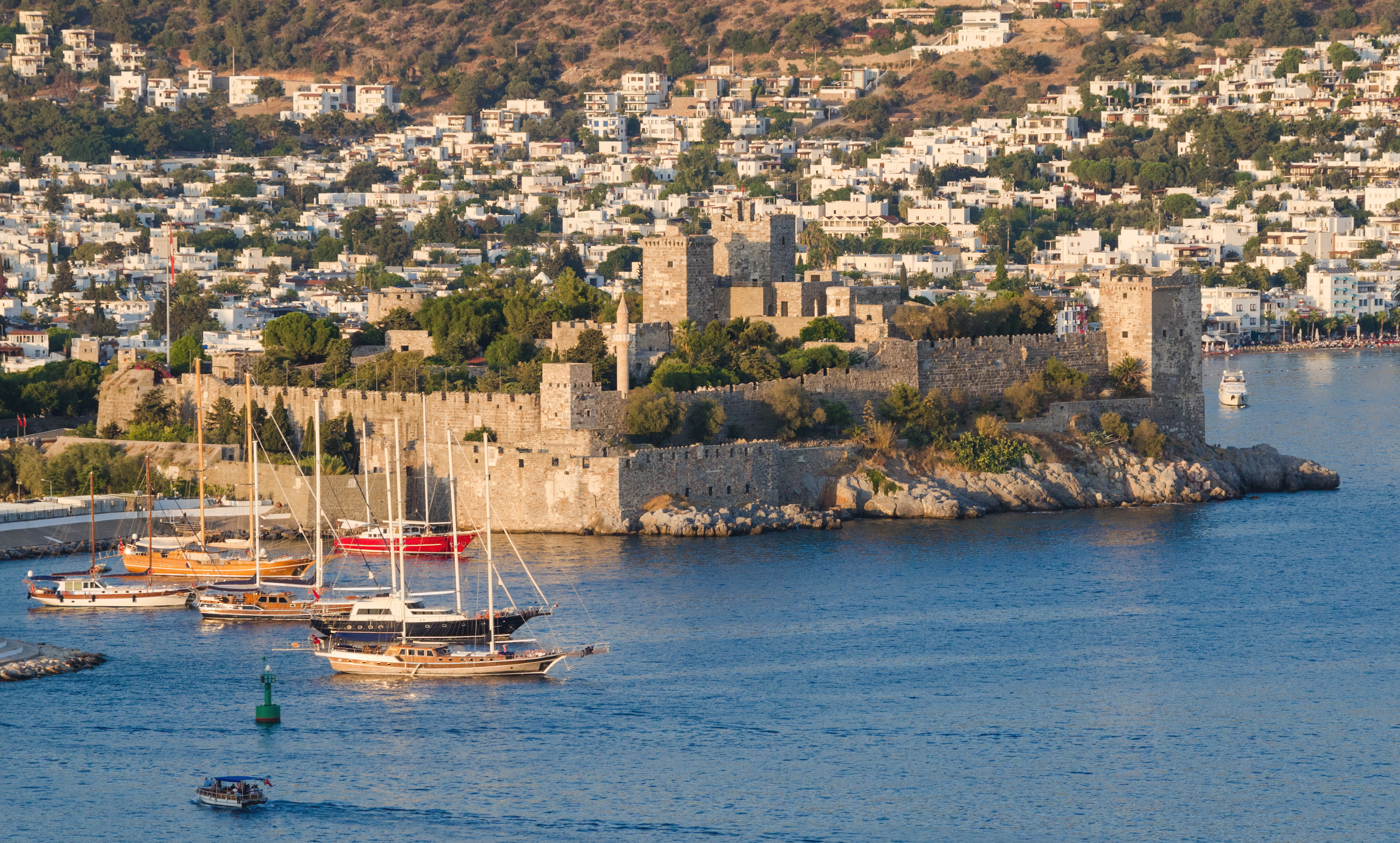
The Castle of St. Peter was built by the Knights Hospitaller.

The Castle of St. Peter, also known as Bodrum Castle, is one of the main attractions of the peninsula. The castle was built by the Knights Hospitaller during the 15th century, and the walls of the fortification contain pieces of the ruins of the Mausoleum, which was used as a source of construction materials. The Castle of Bodrum retains its original design and character of the Knights' period and reflects Gothic architecture. It also contains the Bodrum Museum of Underwater Archaeology, a museum established by the Turkish government in 1962 to host the underwater discoveries of ancient shipwrecks in the Aegean Sea. In 2016, the castle was included in the Tentative list of World Heritage Sites in Turkey. The castle has been under renovation since 2017, and only some parts of it are accessible to visitors.

Built in the fourth century BC, the ruins of the Mausoleum at Halicarnassus are also among the main sights in Bodrum. The Mausoleum at Halicarnassus was a tomb designed by Greek architects and built for Mausolus, a satrap of the Persian Empire, and his sister-wife Artemisia II of Caria. The structure was considered one of the Seven Wonders of the Ancient World. By the twelfth century AD, the structure had largely been destroyed. Today, the ruins of the tomb continue to attract both domestic and international tourists. It is planned to turn the ruins into an open-air museum.

Besides the Bodrum Museum of Underwater Archaeology, other museums are also located on the peninsula. Zeki Müren Art Museum is dedicated to Turkish classical musician Zeki Müren. After his death, the house in Bodrum where he lived during the later years of his life was transformed into the Zeki Müren Art Museum by order of the Ministry of Culture and was opened to the public on 8 June 2000. Bodrum Maritime Museum is another museum dedicated to the classification, exhibition, restoration, conservation, storage, and safekeeping of historical documents, works, and objects that are important to the city's maritime history. Bodrum City Museum is a minor museum in the city center that presents the general history of the Bodrum peninsula.

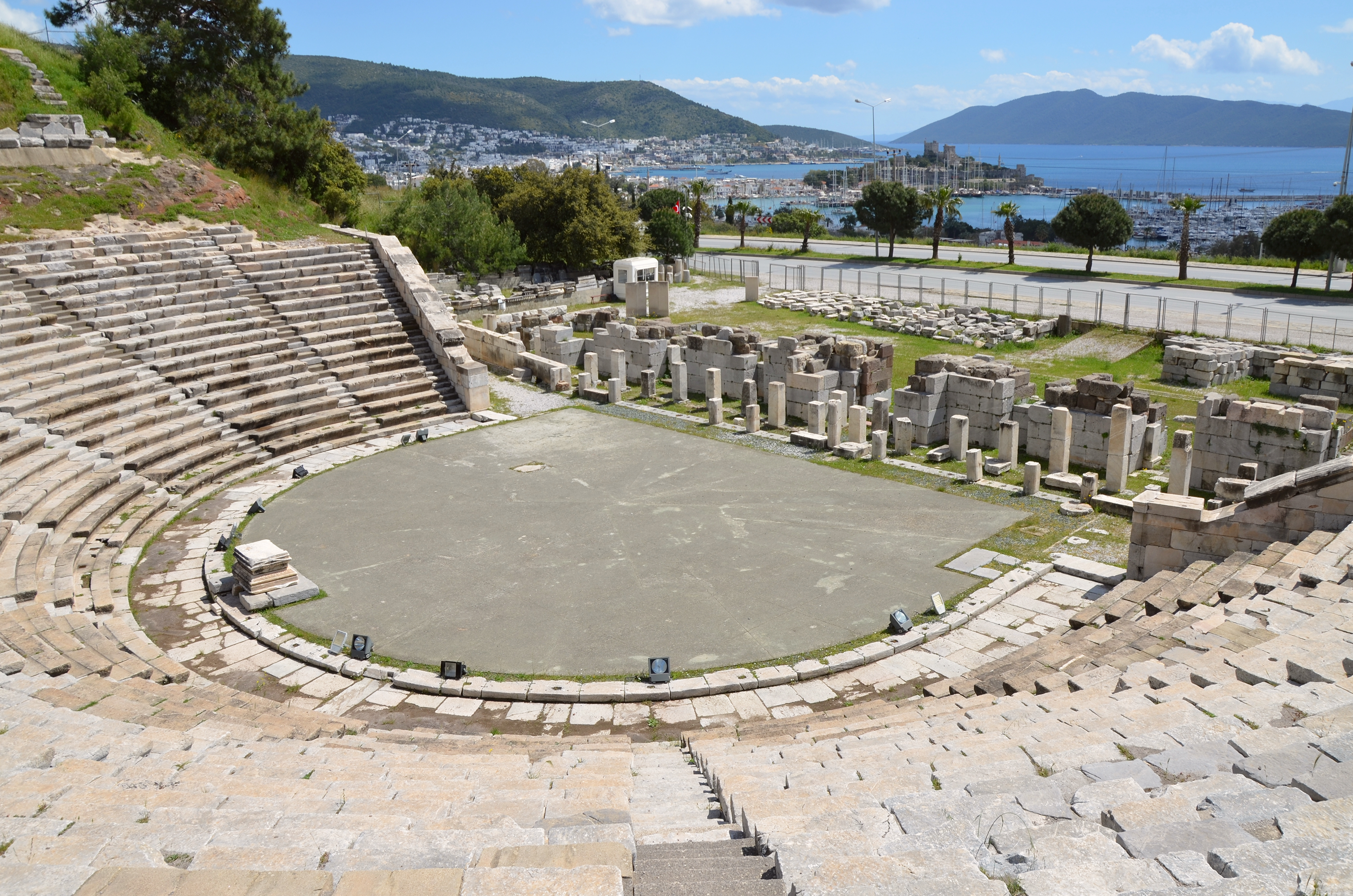
Theatre at Halicarnassus

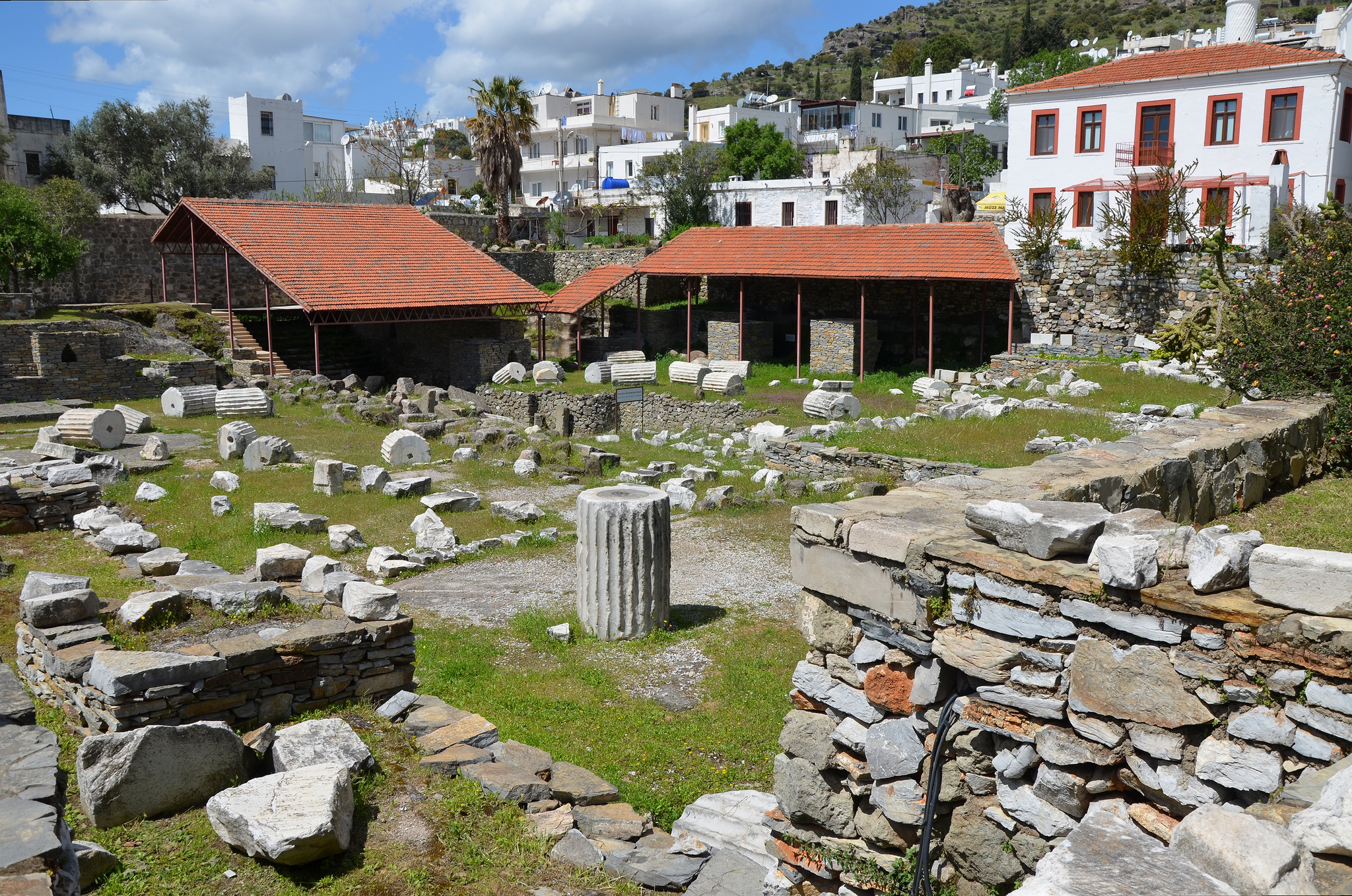
The ruins of the Mausoleum at Halicarnassus

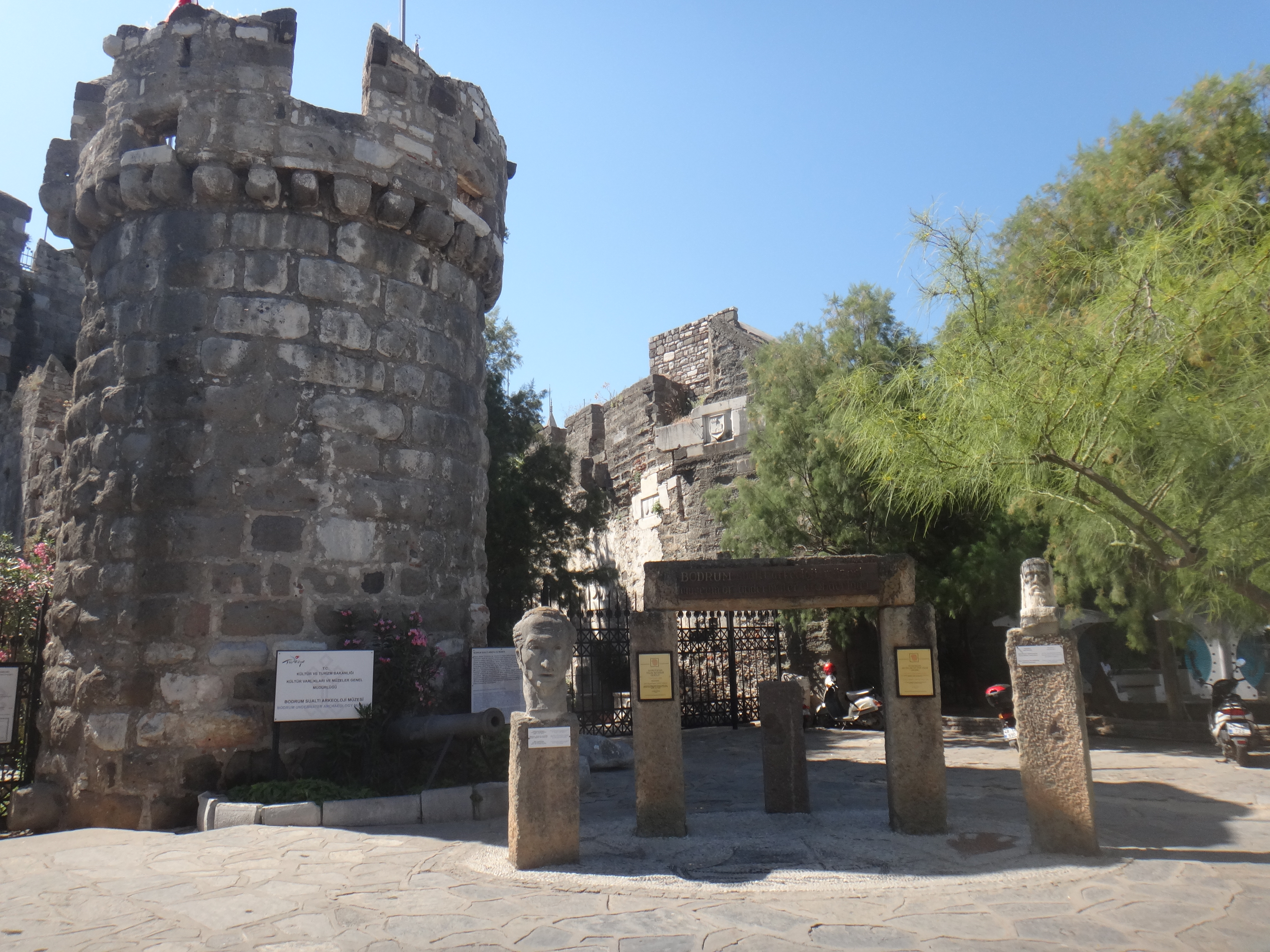
Entrance of Museum of Underwater Archaeology

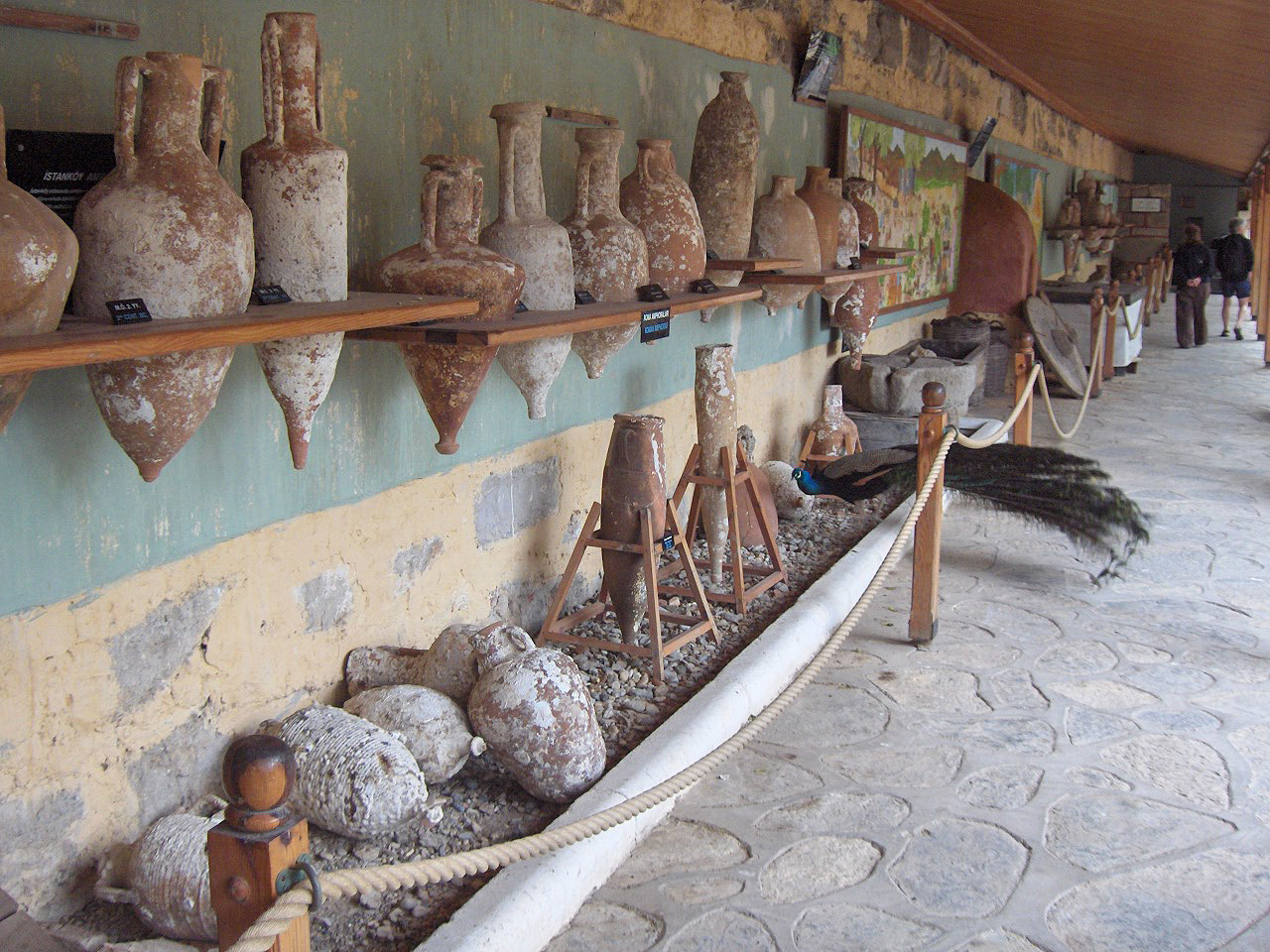
Collection of amphoras in Museum of Underwater Archaeology

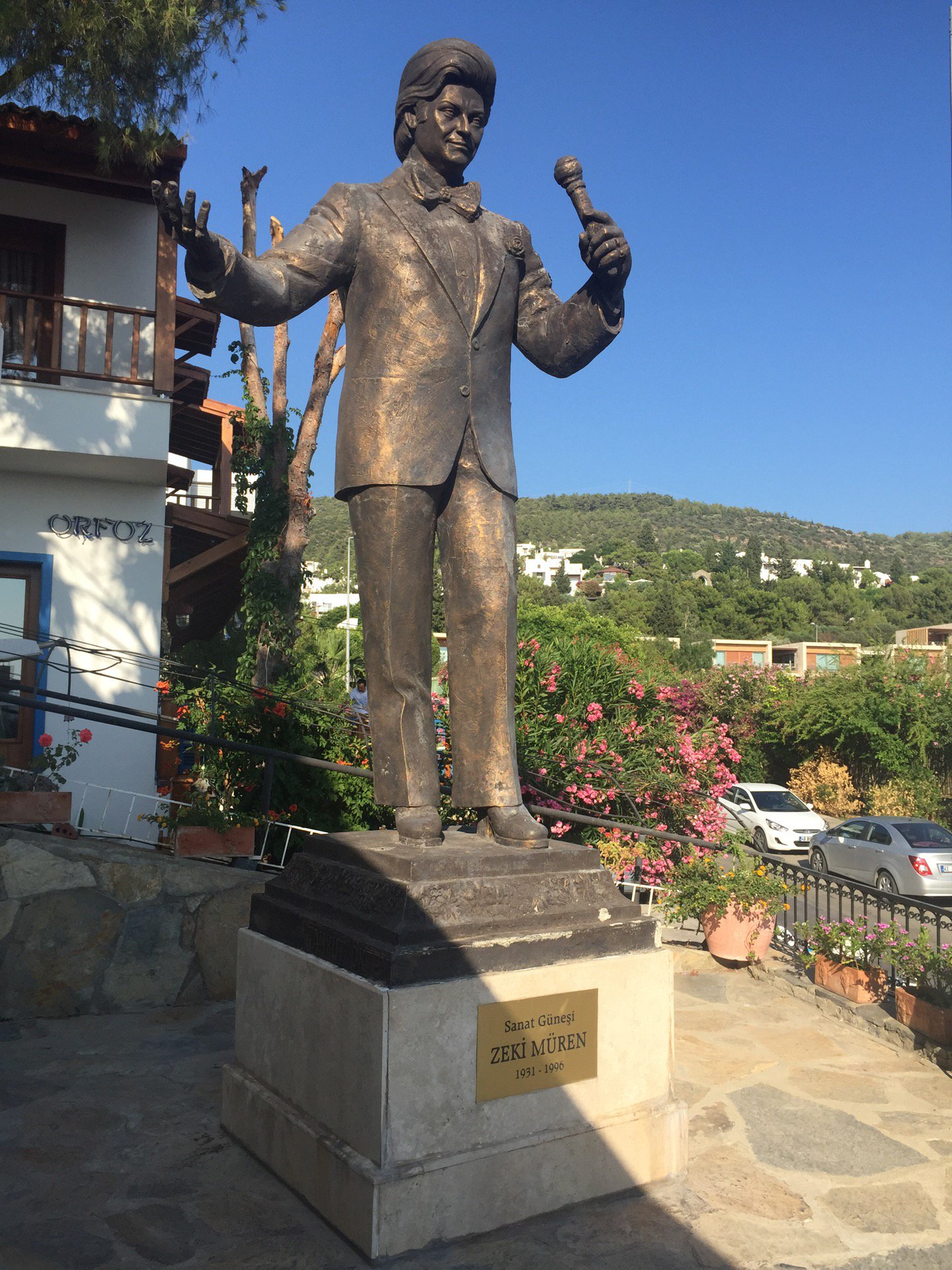
Zeki Müren's statue at Zeki Müren Art Museum

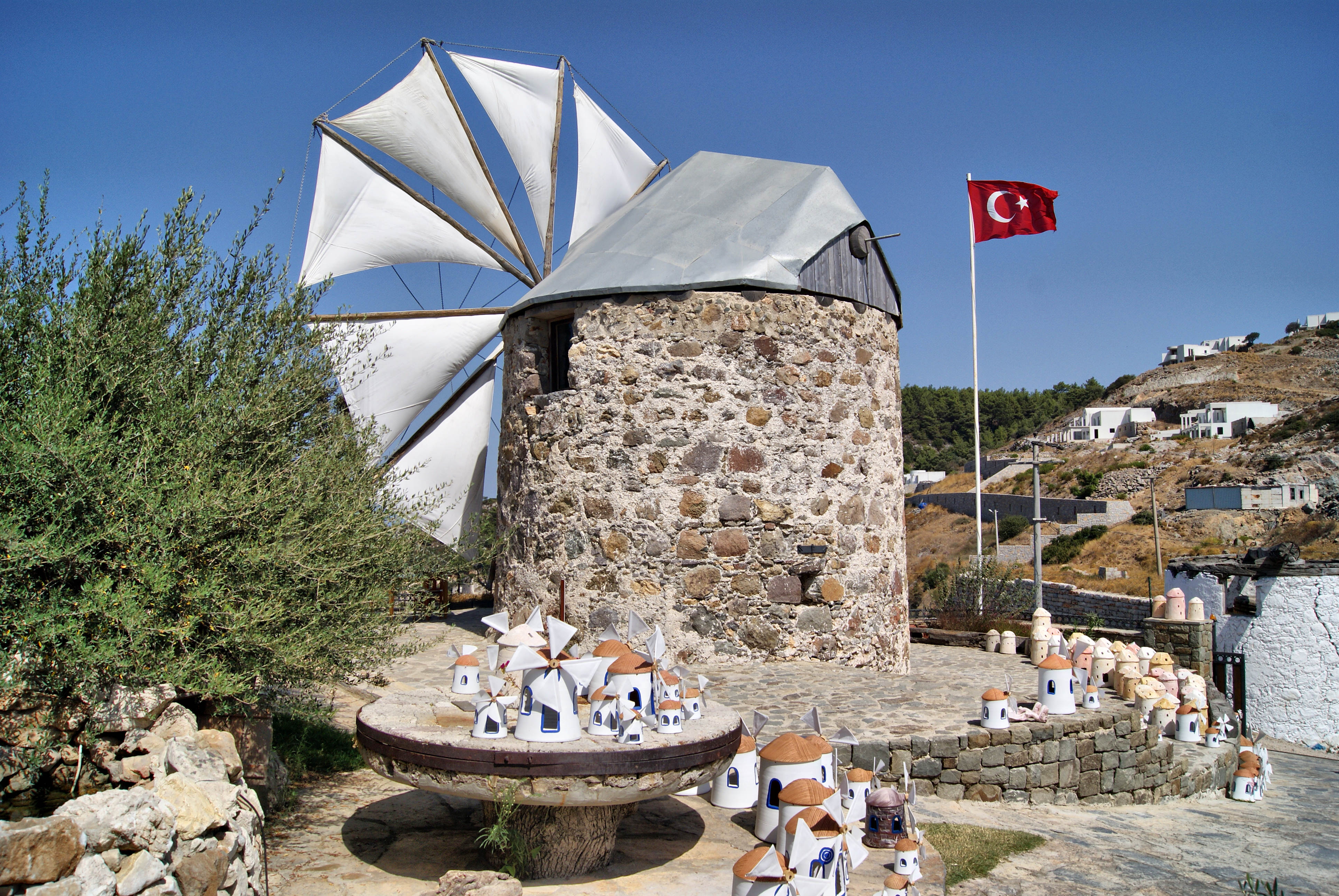
Windmills of Bodrum

== Demographics ==
District population

Year	Pop.	±% p.a.
1965	25,811	—
1970	27,383	+1.19%
1975	29,490	+1.49%
1980	32,517	+1.97%
1985	37,966	+3.15%
1990	56,821	+8.40%

Year	Pop.	±% p.a.
1997	75,994	+4.24%
2007	105,474	+3.33%
2012	136,317	+5.26%
2017	164,158	+3.79%
2022	192,964	+3.29%

Source: Population censuses (1965-1997) and TÜIK (2007-2022)

== Government ==
The district of Bodrum is one of 957 in Turkey. It is in Muğla Province, which is part of the Aydin Subregion, which, in turn, is part of the Aegean Region. Bodrum became a sub-district of the Ottoman Empire in 1871 and a district of Muğla Province in 1872. Bodrum Municipality operates with its 18 directorates and subsidiary units in the entire Bodrum Peninsula, which covers an area of 689 km^{2} and a coastline of 215 km. The organizational structure of Bodrum Municipality is composed of the mayor, four deputy mayors, and 18 directorates.

Bodrum Municipality served as the sole district municipality in the Bodrum region for many years. With the increase in the population of the peninsula, a town municipality called Karatoprak (Turgutreis) was established in 1967. The increase in the population also led to the establishment of the Mumcular (1972), Yalıkavak (1989), and Gündoğan Municipalities (1992).

Following the new municipality law of 1999, many villages in Bodrum were turned into towns: Ortakent-Yahşi with the integration of Ortakent and Yahşi villages, Göltürkbükü with the integration of Gölköy, and Türkbükü and Yalı with the integration of Yalı and Kızılağaç villages. The same year, the municipalities of Gümüşlük, Konacık, and Bitez were also founded, raising the number of municipalities in the Bodrum Peninsula to 11.

After Muğla Province received metropolitan municipality status, these town municipalities were abolished, and all towns across the province were integrated into the city of Bodrum. Since 30 March 2014, the peninsula has been governed as a sole municipality.

=== Neighbourhoods ===
There are 56 neighbourhoods in Bodrum District:

- Akçaalan
- Akyarlar
- Bahçelievler
- Bahçeyakası
- Bitez
- Çamarası
- Çamlık
- Çarşı
- Cevatşakir
- Çiftlik
- Çırkan
- Çömlekçi
- Cumhuriyet
- Dağbelen
- Dereköy
- Dirmil
- Eskiçeşme
- Farilya
- Geriş
- Gökpınar
- Gölbaşı
- Gölköy
- Gümbet
- Gümüşlük
- Gündoğan
- Gürece
- Güvercinlik
- İslamhaneleri
- Karabağ
- Karaova
- Kemer
- Kızılağaç
- Konacık
- Koyunbaba
- Küçükbük
- Kumbahçe
- Kumköy
- Mazıköy
- Mumcular
- Müskebi
- Peksimet
- Pınarlıbelen
- Sazköy
- Tepecik
- Tepecik Karaova
- Torba
- Turgutreis
- Türkbükü
- Türkkuyusu
- Umurca
- Yahşi
- Yakaköy
- Yalıkavak
- Yeniköy
- Yeniköy Karaova
- Yokuşbaşı

== Economy ==
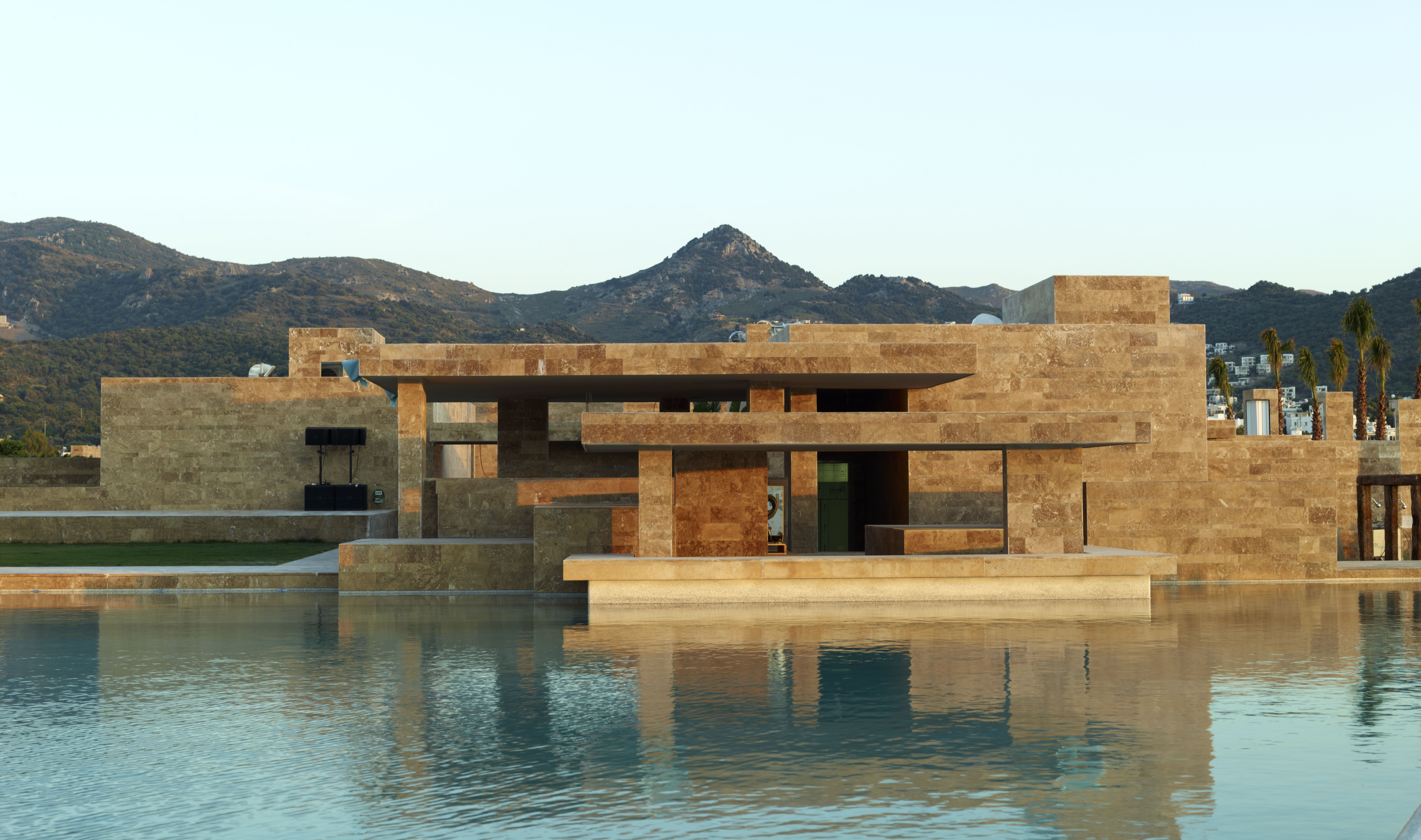
Yalıkavak Marina is a luxury port and shopping mall in Yalıkavak, Bodrum

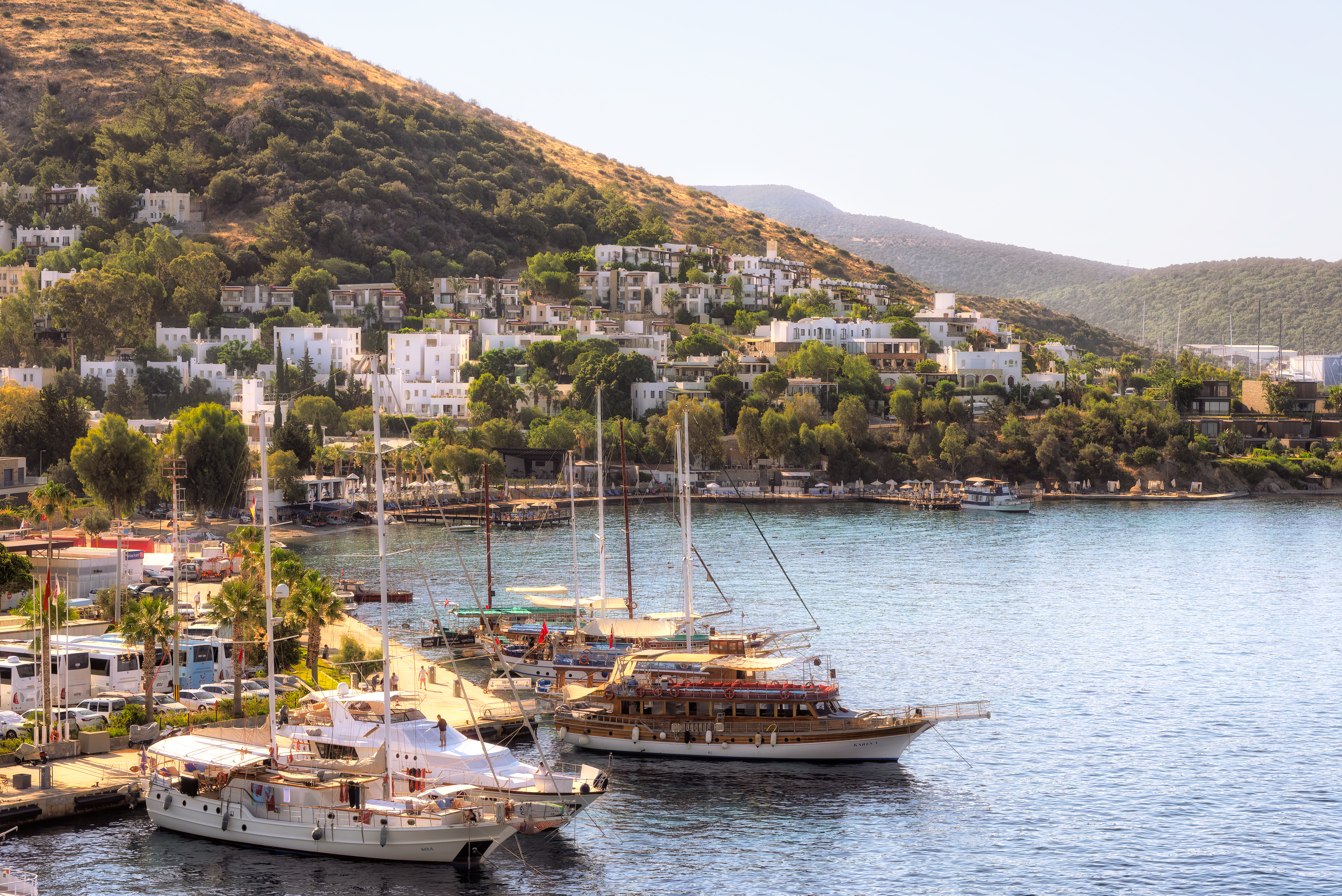
Bodrum Marina

During the 20th century, the city's economy was mainly based on fishing and sponge diving. Even though naked sponge diving in the Aegean region can be traced back at least 3,000 years, modern sponge diving became prevalent in Bodrum after Koan and Cretan immigrants settled in the city in the early 1920s, after the population exchange between Greece and Turkey. During its golden age between 1945 and 1965, about 150 boats engaged in sponge diving activities in Bodrum. However, sponge diseases, artificial sponge production, and a ban on sponge diving eventually ended this lucrative industry.

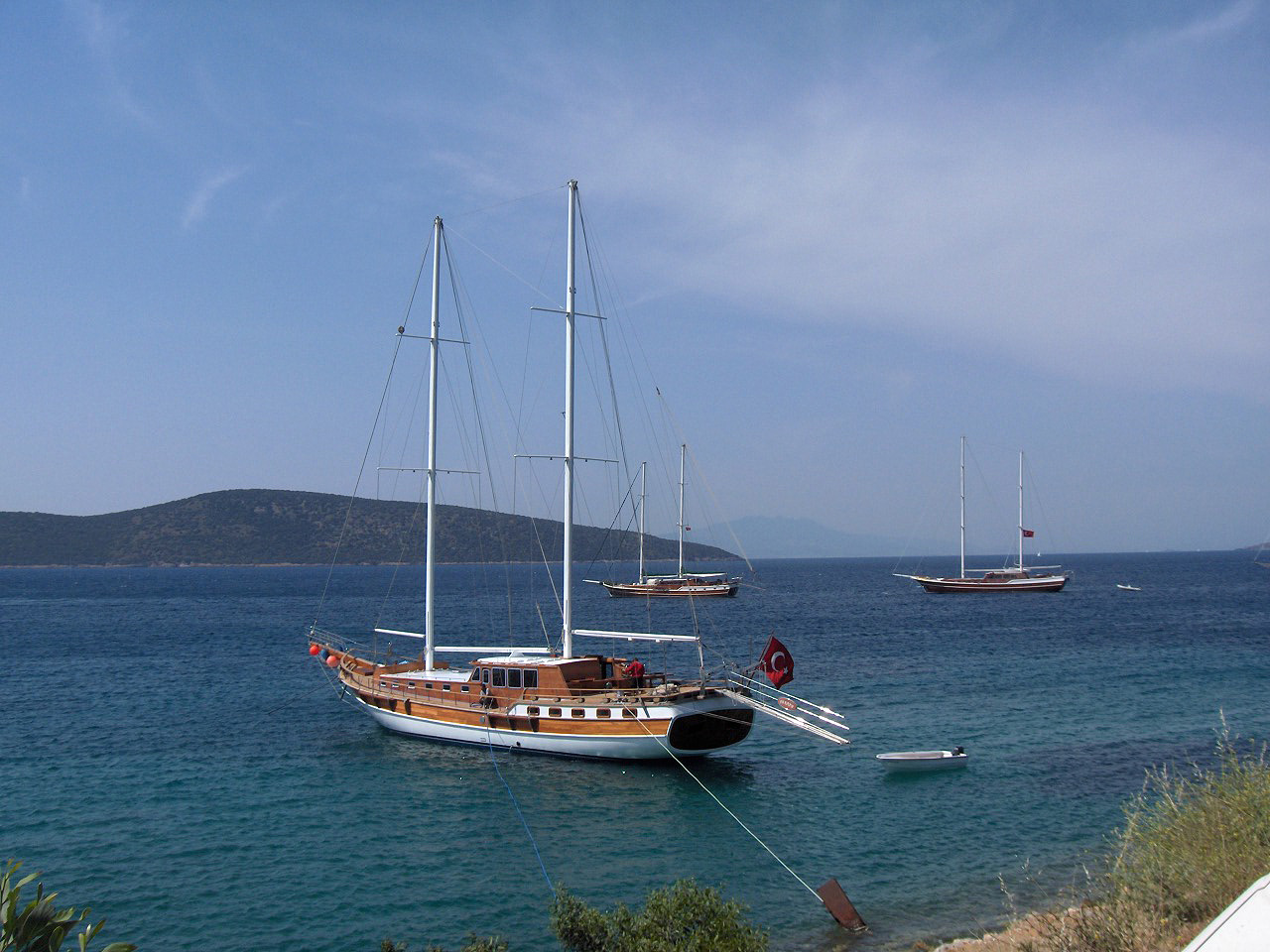
Gulet type schooners near Bodrum

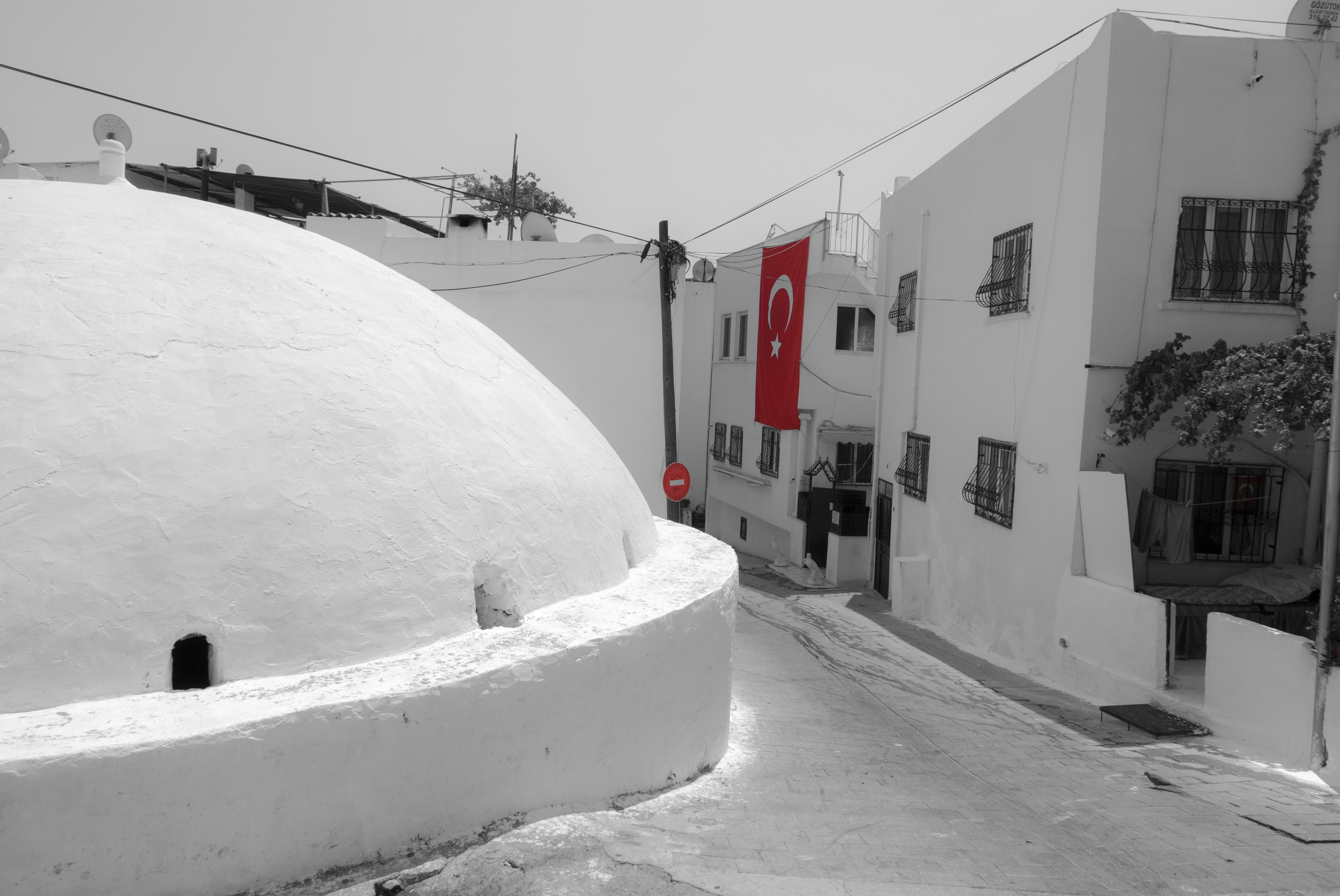
White-washed stone houses in Bodrum

Over the years, tourism became a major activity and income source for local communities. The abundance of visitors has also enlivened Bodrum's retail and service industries. Leather goods, particularly for traditional woven sandals, are well-known products. Other traditional goods, such as tangerine-flavored Turkish delight, nazar amulets, and handicrafts are popular souvenirs.

Apart from small shopping facilities, the city hosts a few shopping malls, such as Midtown and Oasis. There are also marinas for yachts and small ships, such as Milta Bodrum Marina, D-Marin Turgutreis, and the award-winning Yalıkavak Marina.

The Carian Trail, which passes by Bodrum and the surrounding Kızılağaç and Pedasa ruins, attracts hikers from both inside and outside Turkey.

== Culture ==
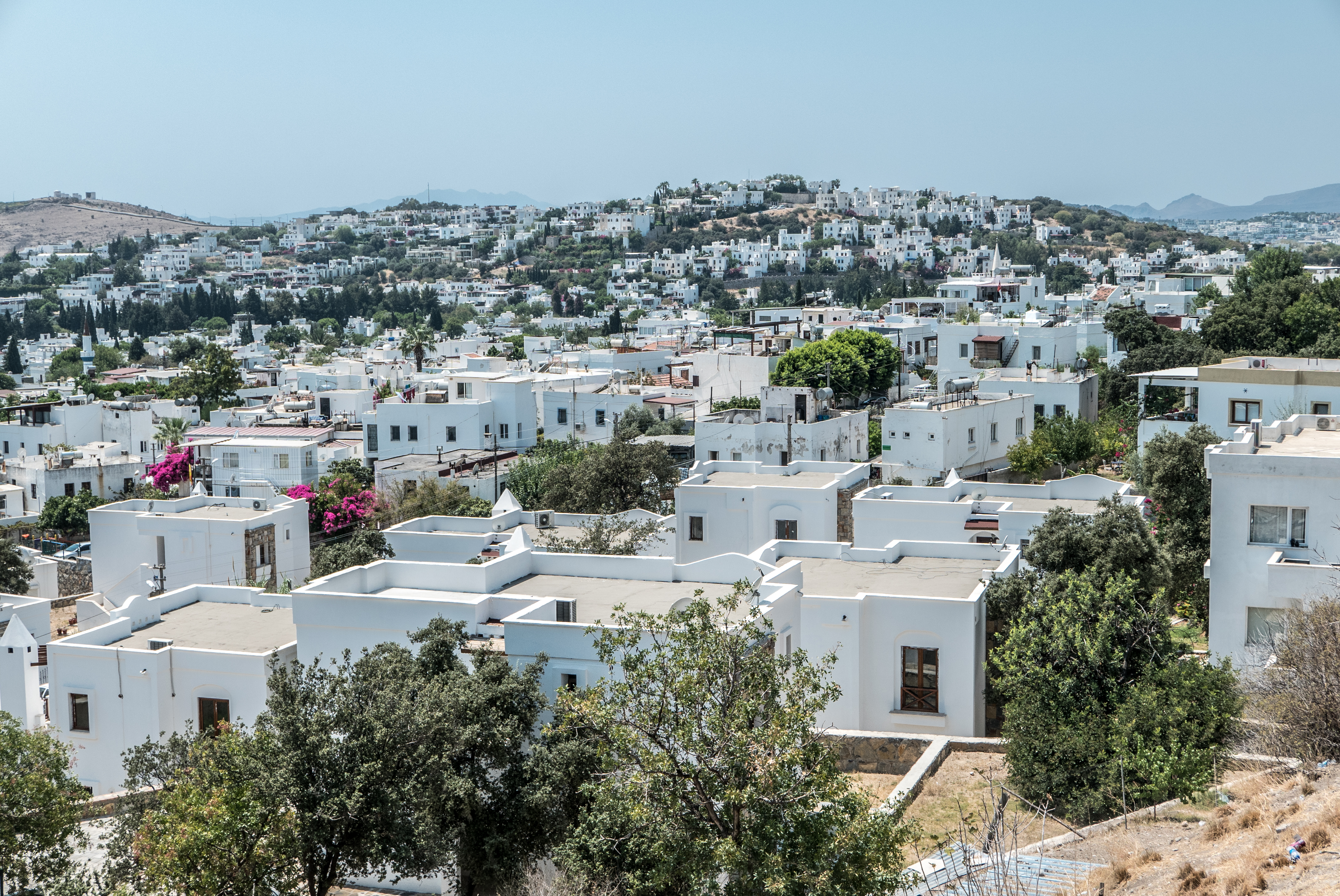
Bodrum's cityscape is dominated by white buildings.

=== Architecture ===
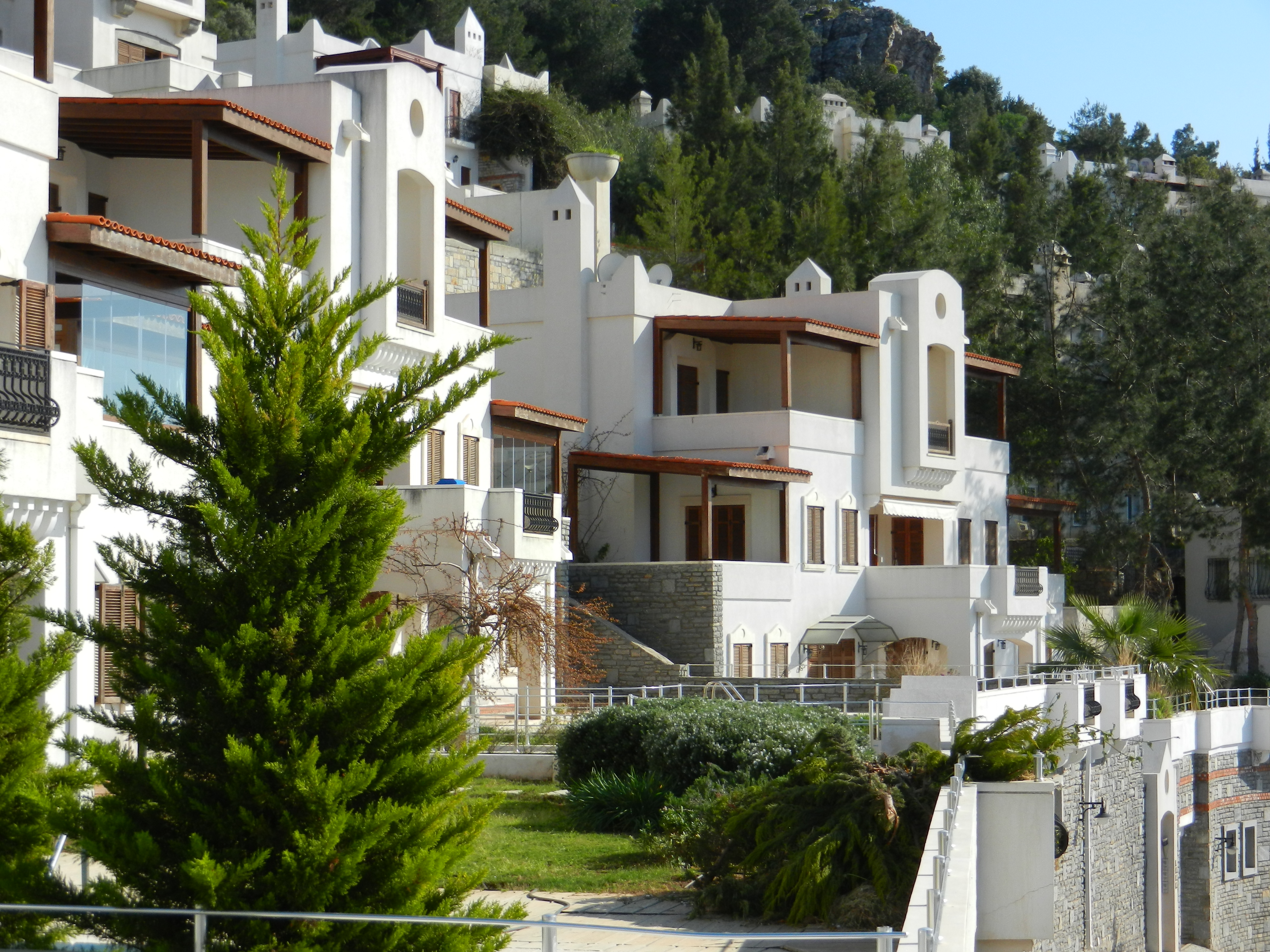
Traditional white houses in Bodrum.

Traditional Bodrum houses are characterized by their prismatic shapes, simple designs and locally sourced building materials like stone, wood, clay and cane. They also tend to have white dominated exterior walls with some blue parts (doors, windows). The tradition of white-washed walls is associated with the bug and scorpion repellent properties of lime, which is found in white paint. It is also traditionally applied in most hot regions for heat-reflecting properties of white color. Blue is also believed by locals to protect against the malicious effects of envy (similar to the Anatolian belief Nazar, originated in Mesopotamia).

According to Muğla Municipality, in order to acquire a building permit one has to agree to paint the walls of the new building white. Use of any paint other than white on the exterior walls of a building was officially banned by Muğla Governor Temel Koçaklar in 2006. This was implemented to protect the historical fabric and cultural identity of the city.

=== Events and festivals ===
Bodrum International Ballet Festival has been held in Bodrum every summer since 2002. Bodrum has also hosted the Bodrum International Biennial since 2014. Bodrum Baroque Music Festival is another, annual, music event held in the city.

== Transportation ==
=== Airports ===
There are no civilian airports located in the district's borders and Milas–Bodrum Airport and Kos Island International Airport are the main airports that serve the city. Milas–Bodrum Airport is located 36 kilometres (22 mi) northeast of Bodrum, with both domestic and international flights. Kos Island International Airport, 70 kilometres (43 mi) to the SW, located in Andimachia, Greece, accessible by boats from Bodrum across a 20 kilometres (12 mi) stretch of the Aegean Sea. Aside from year-round flights to Greek destinations, Kos airport's traffic is seasonal.

Built in 1987, Bodrum-Imsik Airport once served the city before its closure to commercial flights in the late 1990s. Due to financial and legal problems caused by a landownership dispute, the airport was sold to Presidency of Defense Industries in 1997. It is currently being operated as an air base.

=== Bus ===
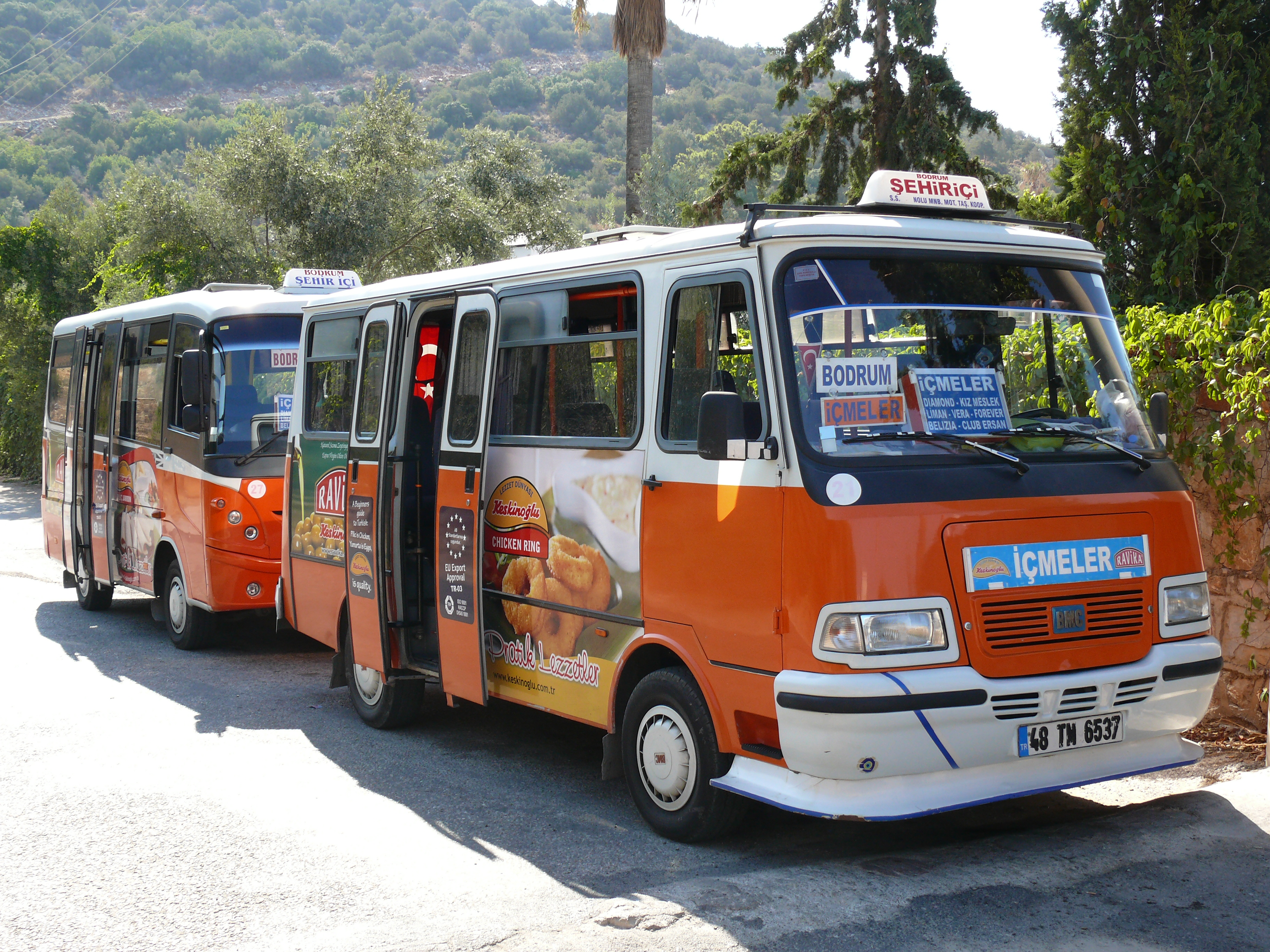
Two dolmuş near İçmeler, Bodrum.

The main bus station of Bodrum district used to be located in the city center, but this has changed in 2021 when it was moved to a newly built facility in Torba, around 6 km away from the town to ease traffic jams in the city center during the high season. The old bus station still has the interdistrict buses, but intercity bus services to other locations in Turkey were redirected to the new station. The new station is powered by solar power, and contains 6 electric car charging units, which was described to be a first for a bus terminal in Turkey by the Muğla Mayor Osman Gürün.

Most of the public transportation in the city is based on local shared taxis called "dolmuş". Each of these privately owned minibuses displays their particular route on signboards behind the windscreens. The word derives from the Turkish for "full" or "stuffed", as these shared taxis depart from the terminal only when a sufficient number of passengers have boarded. Apart from these minibuses Muğla Municipality also has a scheduled bus service program between towns on the Bodrum peninsula. Public transportation between major towns such as Gümbet, Bitez, Turgutreis and the main bus station is non-stop.

=== Port ===
The port has ferries to other nearby Turkish and Greek ports and islands. Bodrum has three large marinas and cruise berths. The first marina, Milta, is located in the center of Bodrum. The second marina is located in Turgutreis, and the third, Palmarina, in Yalikavak.

Luxury marina Yalikavak Marina near Bodrum was long in the hands of Mübariz Mansimov, a Turkish-Azerbaijani oligarch and shipping magnate until Erdogan handed management over to Mehmet Ağar, his former interior minister. After 2022, the marina became a safe haven for fleeing Russian oligarchs, like Roman Abramovich.

== Wildlife ==
Maquis shrubland biome, which is the typical vegetation of the Mediterranean climate, is widespread in Bodrum, especially near the coast. Forests cover 61.3% of the district. Conifers such as pines, larches, stone pines, cedars and junipers are the dominant trees in the region. Forested areas are prone to wildfires, which are common in the district's history. 95% of forest fires in Turkey are believed to be caused by human activities and there are concerns that forests are deliberately being set on fire to enlarge the city. The ruling party AKP has been criticized in the media for giving building permits to construct new hotels on burnt and deforested areas.

Wild boars and foxes are prevalent in the area, as are other animals such as pygmy cormorants, Dalmatian pelicans and lesser kestrels. The region is also home to the endangered and internationally protected Mediterranean monk seal.

== Notable people ==
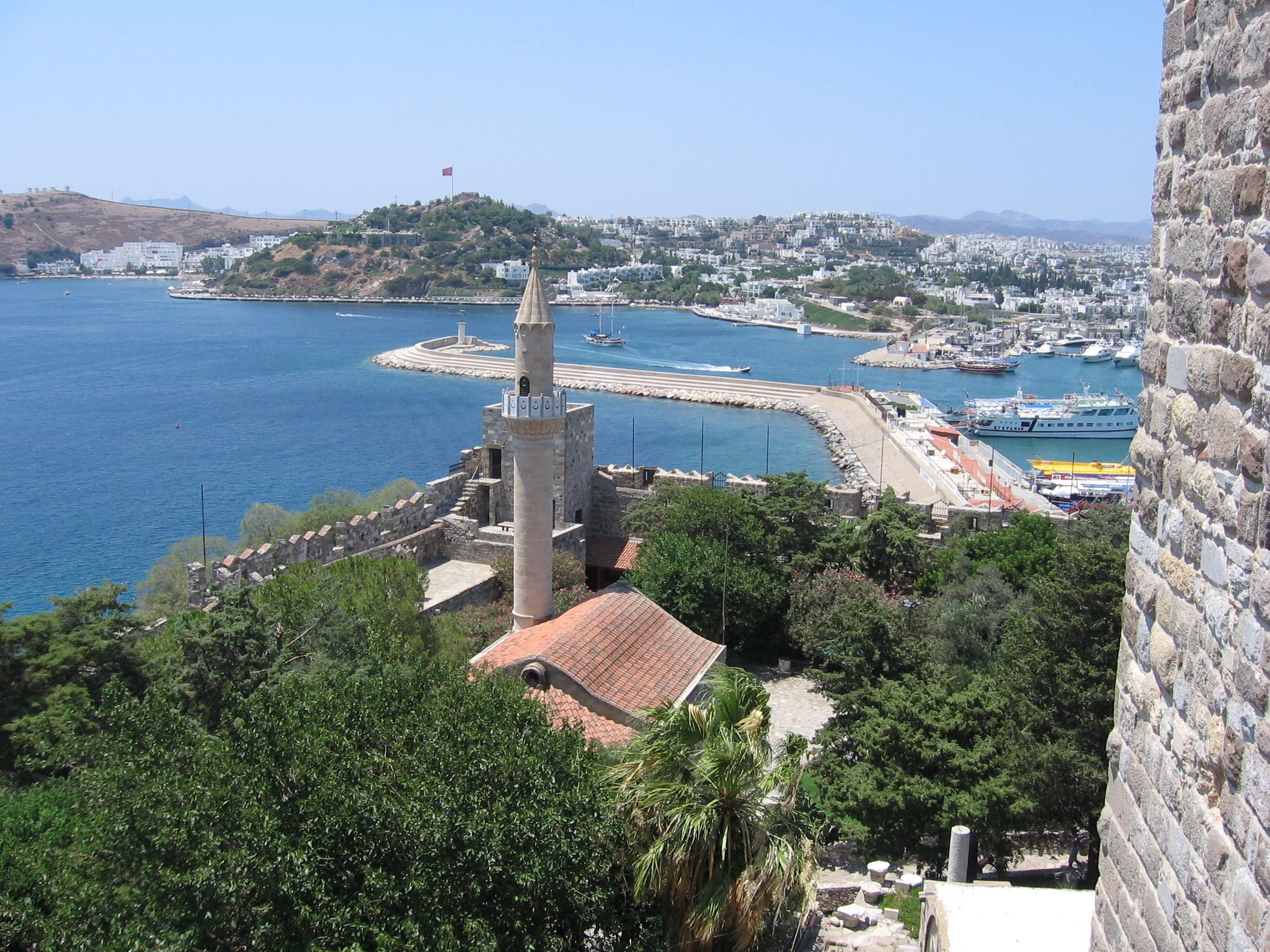
Bodrum Castle Mosque

- Herodotus – ancient Greek historian
- Scylax of Caryanda – ancient explorer
- Julian of Halicarnassus was a bishop in the early 6th century.
- Mausolus – Carian ruler
- Artemisia II of Caria – Carian ruler
- Dionysius – ancient Greek historian and teacher of rhetoric in the Roman period
- Turgut Reis – Ottoman Turkish admiral
- Emmanuel Zairis – Greek painter
- Halikarnas Balıkçısı, literally 'The Fisherman of Halicarnassus' or Cevat Şakir Kabaağaçlı – Turkish writer born in Istanbul, resident of Bodrum for decades and a symbol for the town
- Neyzen Tevfik – Turkish ney virtuoso and pundit
- Zeki Müren – Turkish singer born in Bursa, resident of Bodrum for decades and a symbol for the town
- Janet Akyüz Mattei – director of the American Association of Variable Star Observers (AAVSO) from 1973 to 2004
- Abdurrahman Nafiz Gürman – military officer in the Ottoman and Turkish armies
- Zeynep Çamcı – Turkish actress
- Türkü Turan – Turkish actress

== Twin towns – sister cities ==
Bodrum is twinned with:

- Prizren, Kosovo
- Portimão, Portugal
- Eskişehir, Turkey
- Wakayama, Japan

== See also ==
- Milas–Bodrum Airport
- Kos Airport
- Bodrum Museum of Underwater Archaeology (within Bodrum Castle)
- Turgutreis
- Blue Cruise
- Gulet
- Foreign purchases of real estate in Turkey
- Turkish Riviera
- Gümüşlük, a neighborhood north of Bodrum
