= Türkbükü =

- Neighbourhood
- Location in Turkey Türkbükü (Turkey Aegean)
- Coordinates: 37°07′48″N 27°22′34″E
- Country: Turkey
- Province: Muğla
- District: Bodrum
- Population (2022): 2,566
- Time zone: UTC+3 (TRT)

Türkbükü is a neighbourhood of the municipality and district of Bodrum, Muğla Province, Turkey. Its population is 2,566 (2022). It is a coastal town on the Turkish Riviera on the opposite side of the Bodrum peninsula from the town of Bodrum. Türkbükü has a well protected harbor ringed with high hills containing a number of luxury hotels and holiday villas. The town is situated at the ancient Greek town, Caryanda, the birthplace of the 6th-5th c. BCE Greek explorer Skylax (Σκύλαξ ο Καρυανδεύς), and currently is a favorite vacation spot and second home residency of upper-class Turks, and although less well visited by Western European tourists compared to Bodrum, it is also increasingly popular with foreign visitors.

There are no broad sandy beaches in Türkbükü, but there is a semi-circular boardwalk dense with shops, restaurants, bars and docks for sunbathing in the day and dining in the evening. The protected harbor is a refuge for yachts and allows for swimming in swimming pool like conditions in the morning before the afternoon breeze comes in. In the high tourist season, Turkish pop-stars, models and professional athletes can be sighted at the posh bars and restaurants or strolling along the boardwalk, justifying the popular labeling of Türkbükü as the Saint-Tropez of Turkey.
