= Theatre at Halicarnassus =

Coordinates: 37°02′24″N 27°25′18″E

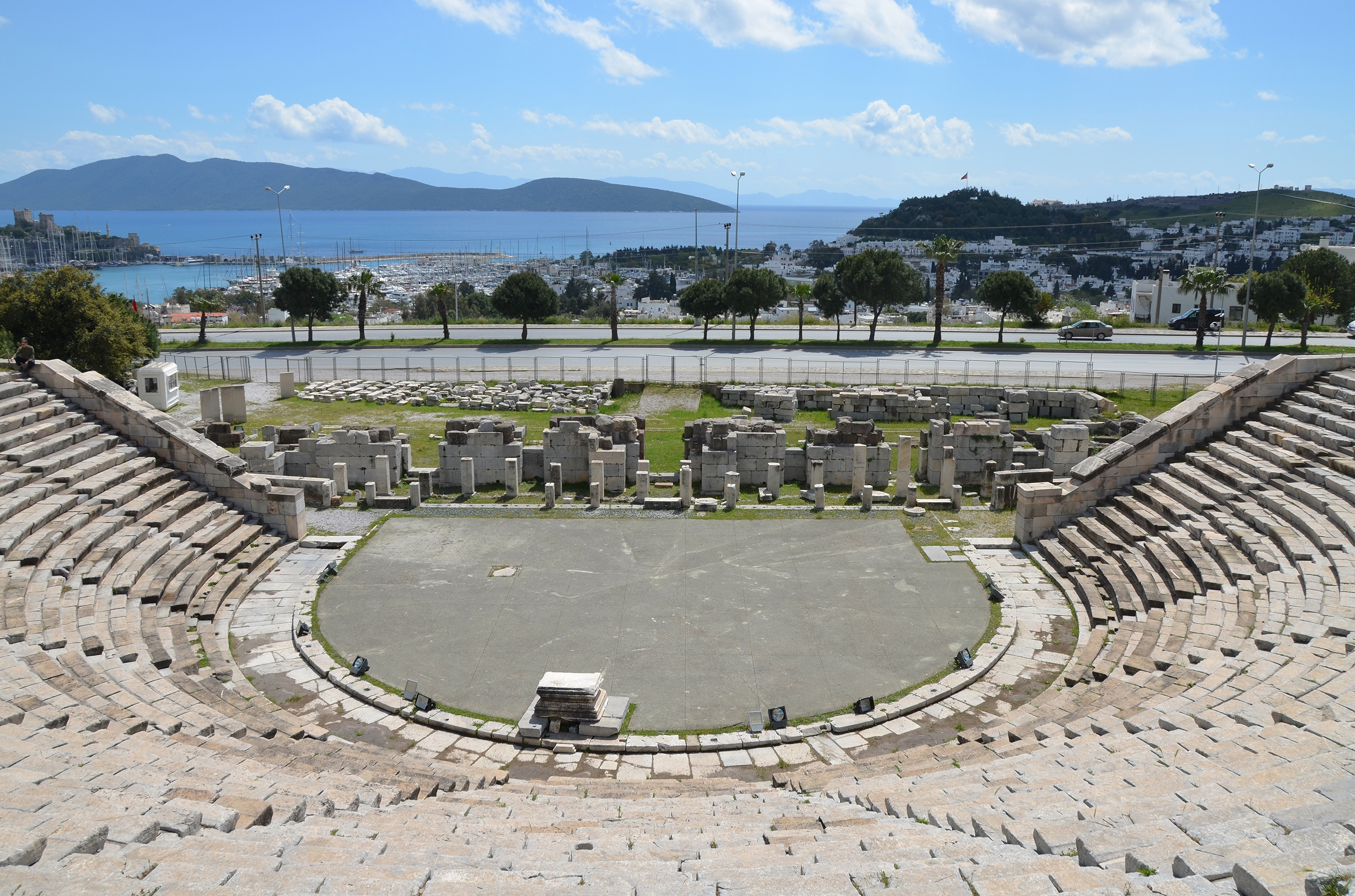
- The Theatre in 2015

- Location within Turkey
- Type: theater
- Cultures: Greek, Roman
- Location: Turkey, Halicarnassus
- Region: Caria
- Part of: Ancient Greek theaters

History
- Built: 4th century BC

Site notes
- Condition: partly restored ruins
- Public access: Archaeological park

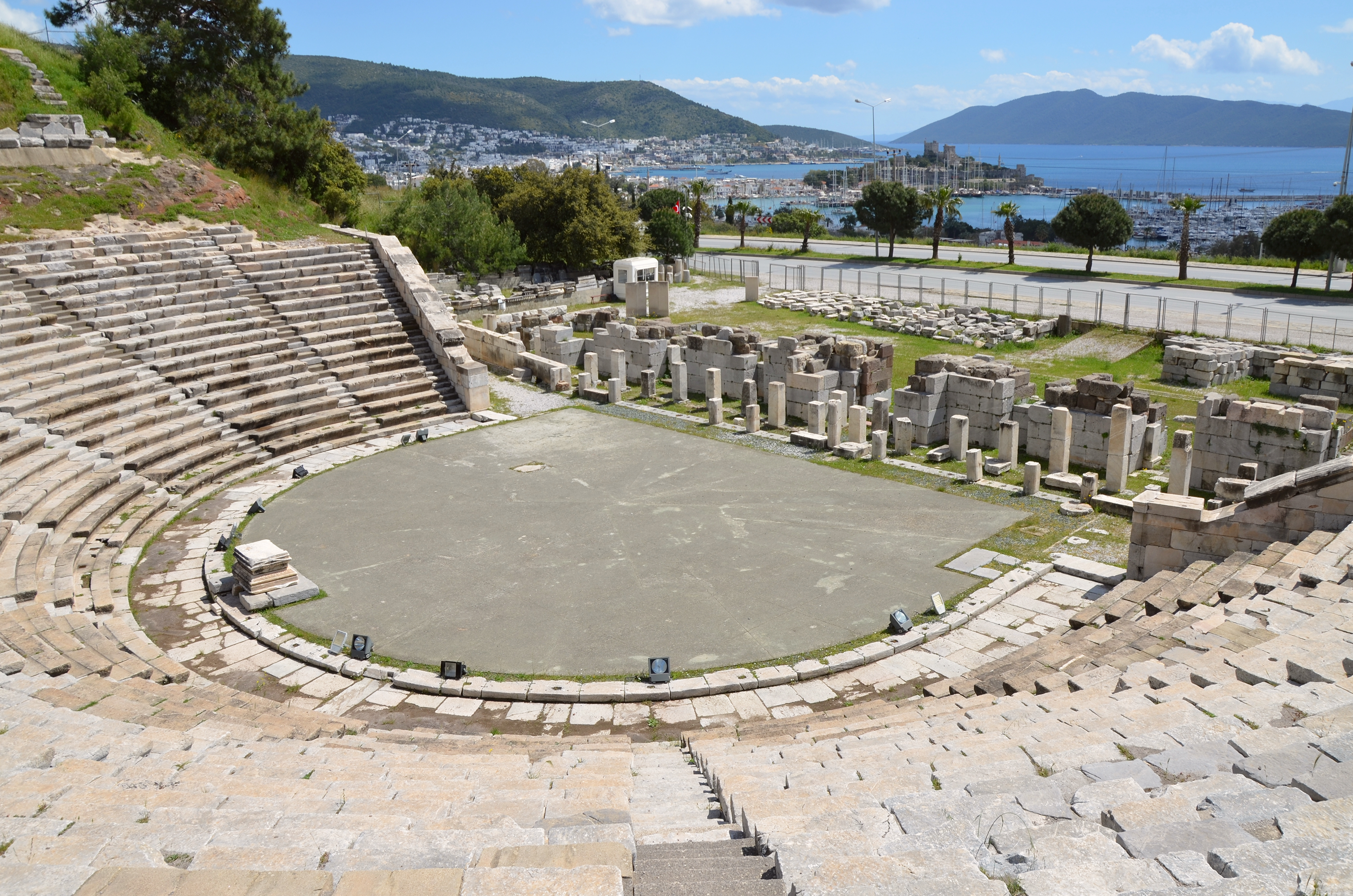
Theatre at Halicarnassus in Bodrum, with the Bodrum Castle seen in the background, 2015.

The Theatre at Halicarnassus, also known as Bodrum Antique Theatre (Turkish: Bodrum Antik Tiyatrosu, usually shortened as Antik Tiyatro), is a 4th-century BC Greco-Roman theatre located in Bodrum, Turkey. The theatre is considered to be built in a similar style to Ancient Theatre of Epidaurus.

== History ==
Construction of the Theatre at Halicarnassus is attributed to the reign of the Carian Satrap Mausolos during the 4th century BC. Ancient theatre was enlarged and took its current form around 2nd century AD, during the Roman era. With a cavea width of 86 meters and an 18 meters orchestra diameter, the theatre originally had a seating capacity of 10,000 to 13,000 people.

The theatre was renovated twice during the 1970s and 1990s by the Turkey's Ministry of Culture and Tourism. Currently the Antique Theatre is being used to host cultural events, such as Bodrum International Ballet Festival and concerts of various Turkish and international artists, with a seating capacity of 10,000 people.

== Gallery ==
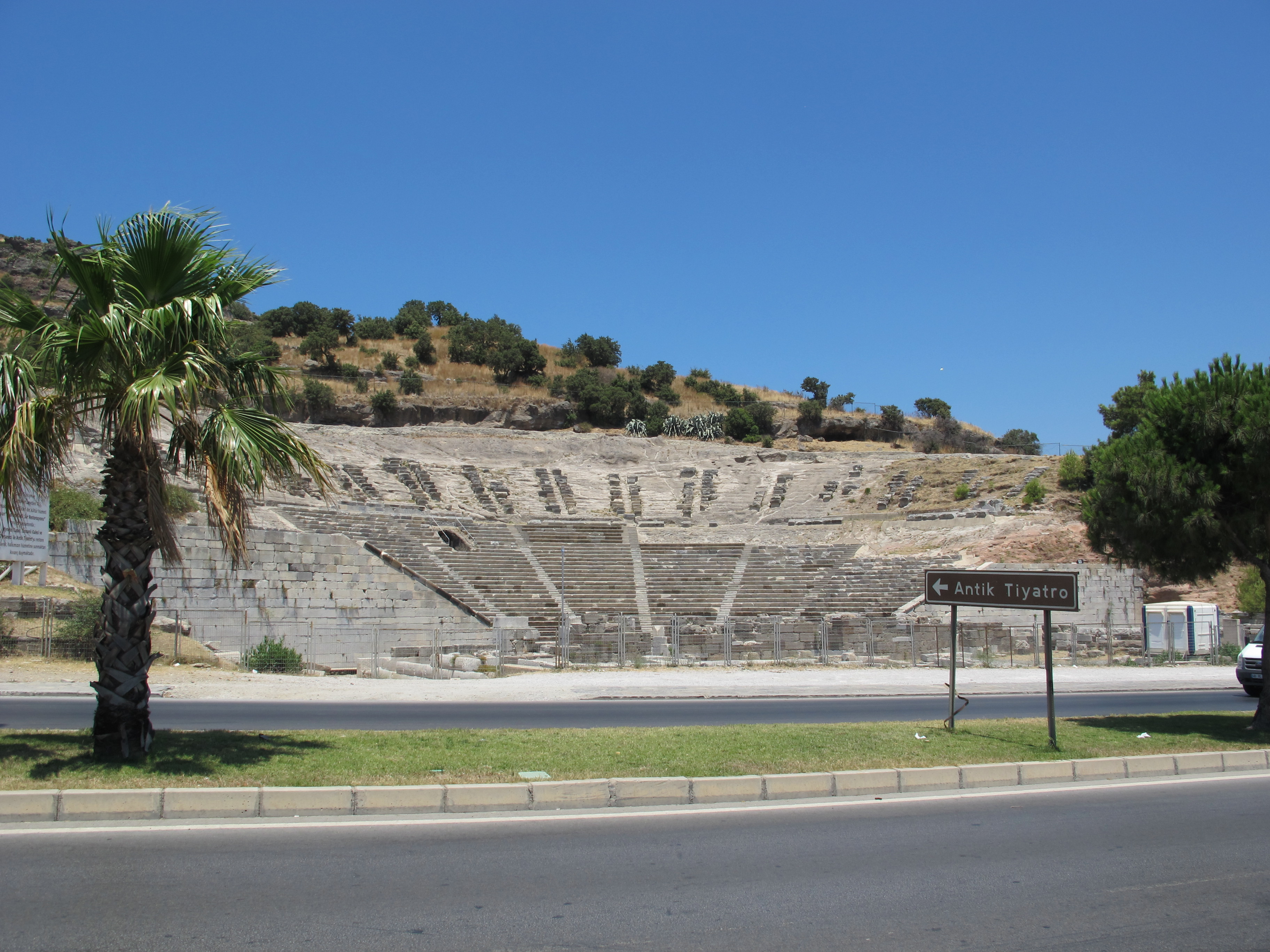
Theatre in 2013

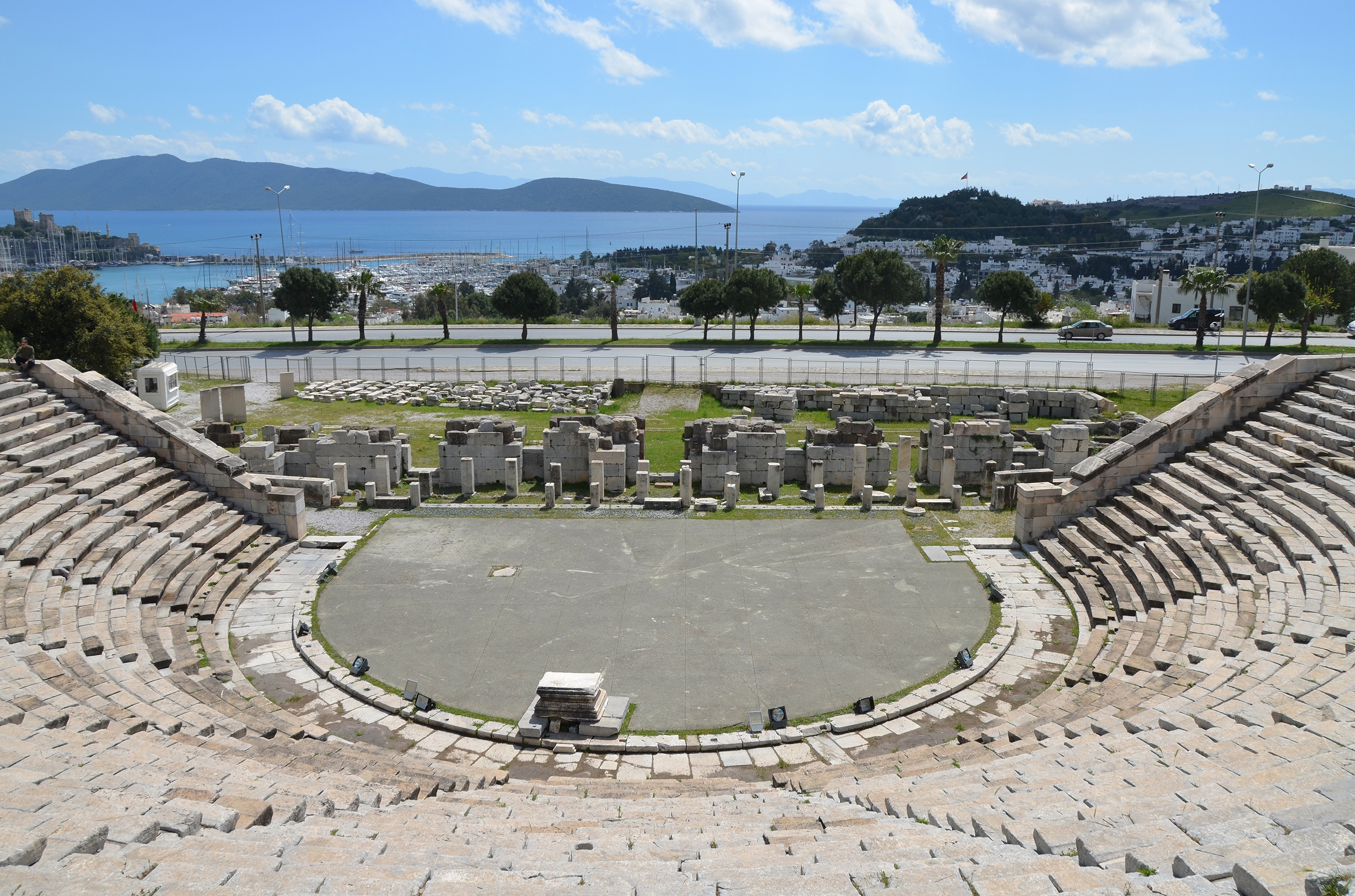
Theatre in 2015

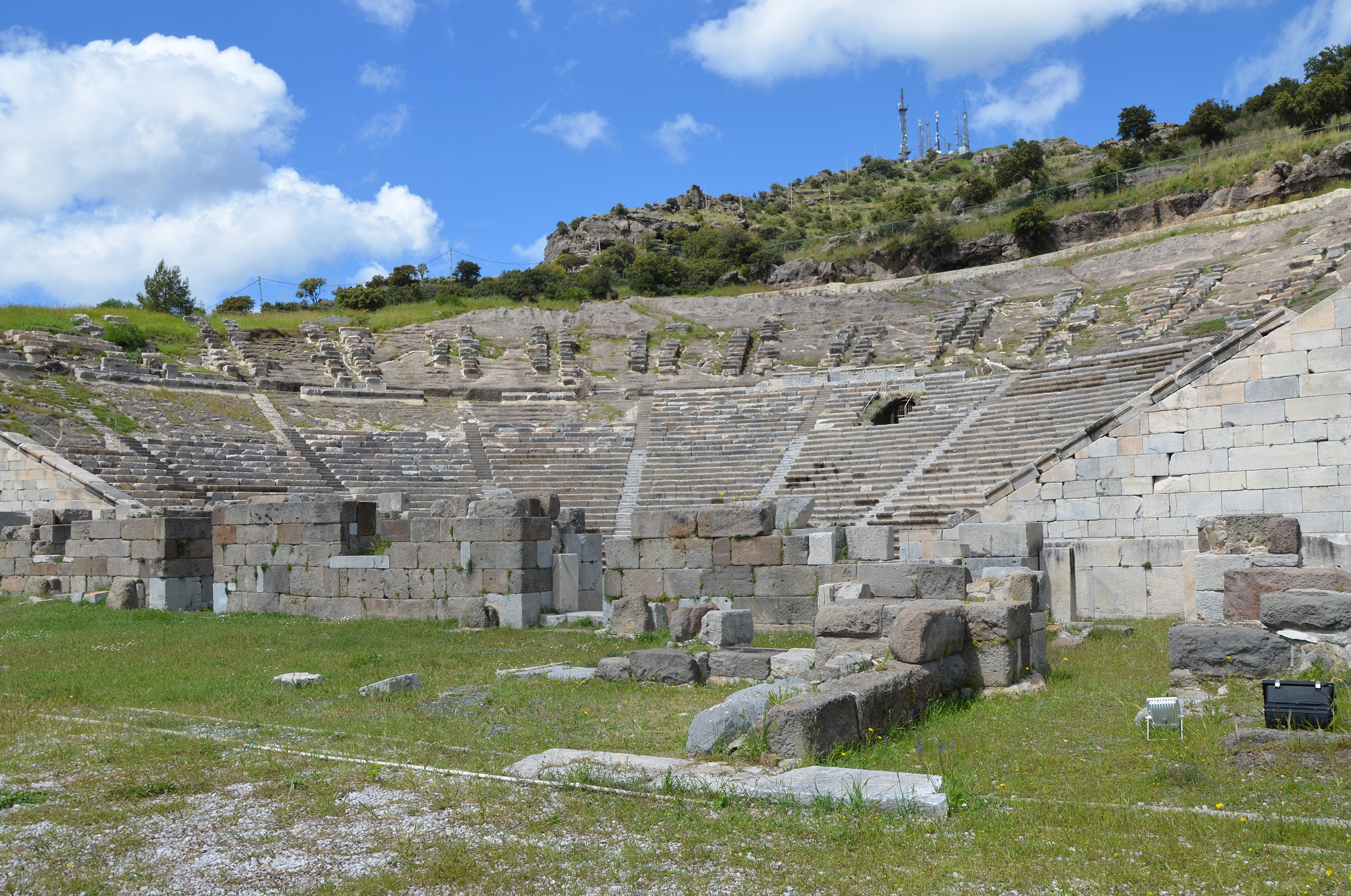
Theatre in 2015
