= Can Togay =

Hungarian film director

- Born: August 27, 1955 (age 70); Budapest, Hungary
- Years active: 1973–2007

Can Togay (Turkish: [ˈdʒan ˈtoɡaj]; born August 27, 1955), also known as János Can Togay, is a Hungarian film director, screenwriter, actor, poet, and cultural diplomat.

== Biography ==
Can Togay was born the son of Turkish parents. He grew up in Budapest, Hungary and Leipzig, East Germany. In 1969, he joined the Péter Halász theatre troupe in Budapest. From 1973 to 1978, he studied German and English literature and linguistics at Eötvös Loránd University in Budapest, followed by two years of post-graduate work on German-French comparative linguistics with Jean-Marie Zemb at Sorbonne Nouvelle in Paris. He graduated in 1980. In 1984, he received a degree in film directing from the University of Theatre and Film Arts in Budapest, and he was a student of Zoltán Fábri. In 1991 he moved to Finland for four years.

His 1992 film A nyaraló was screened in the Un Certain Regard section at the 1992 Cannes Film Festival.

In 1978, his poems were published in Mozgó Világ (Moving World). In 2004, his first volume of poetry was released by Aranykor Kiadó (Golden Age Publisher). He conceived the idea of the Holocaust Memorial Cipők a Duna-parton (Shoes on the Danube Promenade) in Budapest with artist Gyula Pauer.

From January 1, 2008 to October 1, 2014, he was head of Collegium Hungaricum Berlin, the Hungarian Institute for Science and Culture in Berlin; he was also the cultural attaché at the Hungarian Embassy in Berlin.

== Works ==
Director
Year	Original title	English title	Genre
1981	Grand Hotel a Szakadékhoz	Grand Hotel to the Abyss	documentary
1982	Tangó – a változások kora	Tango – The Age of Changes	short film
1983	Ember az égből	A Man from the Sky	short film
1984	Az ördög napja	The Day of the Devil	short film
1985	Volga	Volga	documentary with Gábor Ferenczi
1991	A nyaraló	The Summer Guest	feature film
1999	Egy tél az Isten háta mögött	A Winter in The Back of Beyond	feature film

Screenplays
Year	Original title	English title	Details
1993	A sziget	The Island	Finnish short
1996	Napfogyatkozás 2000	Solar Eclipse 2000	feature film
1997	Glamour	Glamour	feature film
2000	A Hídember	The Bridgeman	feature film with Géza Bereményi
2003	Szerelemtől sújtva	Stricken by Love	feature film with Tamás Sas
2004	Történetek az Elveszett Birodalomból	Stories from the Lost Empire	TV, based on Árpád Ajtony's writings with Frigyes Gödrös
2007	A barátkozás lehetőségei	The Possibilities of Making Friends	TV, based on Ádám Bodor's friends with Gábor Ferenczi

Actor
Original title	Title in English	Genre	Role	Directed by
Petőfi '73 (Hungarian)	Petőfi '73	feature film	protagonist	Ferenc Kardos
Mozart és Salieri (Hungarian)	Mozart and Salieri	feature film	title character	András Surányi
Le dernier métro (French)	The Last Metro	feature film	episode actor	François Truffaut
Redl ezredes (Hungarian)	Colonel Redl	feature film	episode actor	István Szabó
Erőltetett menet (American-Hungarian)	Forced March	feature film	episode actor	Nick Rice
Eszterkönyv (Hungarian)	Eszter-book	feature film	episode actor	Krisztina Deák
Malina (Ger.-Aus.-Fr.)	Malina	feature film	protagonist	Werner Schröter
Zsötem (Hungarian)	Zsötem	Feature film	episode actor	András Salamon
The Blue Exile (Ger.-Tur.-Greek)	Blue Exile	feature film	protagonist	Kiral Erden
Bir Sonbahar Hikayesi (Turkish)	An Autumn Story	feature film	protagonist	Yavuz Özkan
Franciska vasárnapjai (Hungarian)	The Sundays of Franciska	feature film	episode actor	Sándor Simó
Fosforlu Cevriye (Turkish)	Fosforlu Cevriye	TV film	protagonist	Mustafa Altioklar
A Hídember (Hungarian)	The Bridgeman	feature film	episode actor	Géza Bereményi
Sniper 2 (American)	Sniper 2	feature film	episode actor	Craig R. Baxley
Rózsadomb (Ger.-Hun)	Rosemound	feature film	episode actor	Mari Cantu

== Awards ==
- Balázs Béla-award
- München, High School Film Festival, Award for Best High School Program, Special Mention, The Day of the Devil
- Manuscrit de Vercorin screenplay award 95, A Winter in The Back of Beyond
- Budapesti Filmszemle 1999, Award for Best Actor (Eperjes Károly), A Winter in The Back of Beyond
- Szocsi 00 international competition, Surcharge of the Jury, A Winter in The Back of Beyond
- Alexandria Filmfesztivál 1994, Best Male Actor, An Autumn Story
- Movie Actor of the Year, Award of the Turkish Movie Actors' Association, An Autumn Story
