= The Blue Exile =

1993 Turkish drama film

- Directed by: Erden Kıral
- Written by: Erden Kıral
- Starring: Can Togay
- Release date: 1993
- Running time: 108 minutes
- Country: Turkey
- Language: Turkish

The Blue Exile (Turkish: Mavi Sürgün) is a 1993 Turkish drama film directed by Erden Kıral. The film was selected as the Turkish entry for the Best Foreign Language Film at the 66th Academy Awards, but was not accepted as a nominee.

The film is inspired by the autobiographical memoir, also titled Mavi Sürgün, of Cevat Şakir Kabaağaçlı, who wrote under the pen name Halikarnas Balıkçısı – the Fisherman of Halicarnassus.

== Cast ==
- Can Togay as Cevat Şakir
- Hanna Schygulla as The Actress
- Özay Fecht
- Tatiana Papamoschou
- Ayse Romey as Hatice
- Fatih Ozses as the man at the mill

== See also ==
- List of submissions to the 66th Academy Awards for Best Foreign Language Film
- List of Turkish submissions for the Academy Award for Best Foreign Language Film
