= Bodrum International Ballet Festival =

Annual international ballet festival

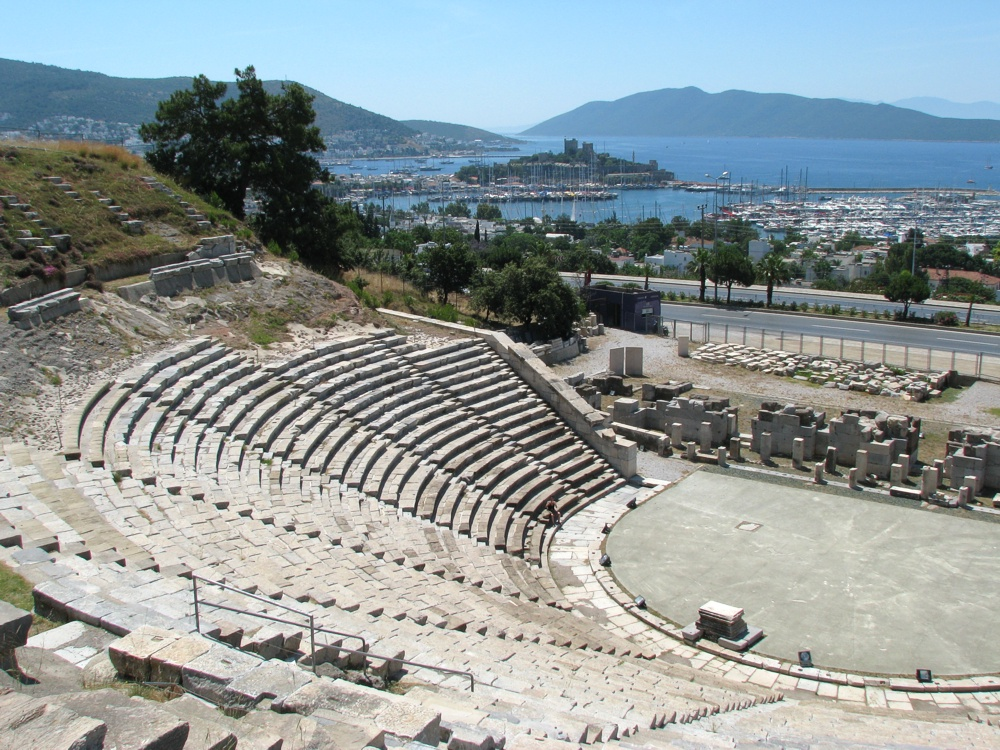
Theatre of Halicarnassus in Bodrum, with the Bodrum Castle seen in the background.

Bodrum International Ballet Festival (Turkish: Uluslararası Bodrum Bale Festivali) is an annual international ballet festival held in the Turkish port city Bodrum. Organised by Turkish State Opera and Ballet since 2002, the festival takes place during summer, usually around July and August. Bodrum Castle and Theatre of Halicarnassus are the main event venues during the festival.

Both national and international ballet groups and performers such as Vienna State Ballet, Sukhishvili Georgian National Ballet, Svetlana Zakharova, and Alonzo King LINES Ballet have performed in the event since its beginning.

== See also ==
- Bodrum
- List of festivals in Turkey
