= Naryandos =

Town of ancient Caria

Naryandos or Nariandos was a town of ancient Caria. It was a polis (city-state).

Its site is unlocated, but suggested to be near Halicarnassus.
