= The Summer Guest =

1992 film

- Directed by: Can Togay
- Written by: Can Togay; Edit Kőszegi
- Starring: Géza Balkay
- Cinematography: Tamás Sas
- Edited by: Ágnes Ostoros
- Release date: 13 March 1992
- Running time: 86 minutes
- Country: Hungary
- Language: Hungarian

The Summer Guest (Hungarian: A nyaraló) is a 1992 Hungarian drama film directed by Can Togay. It was screened in the Un Certain Regard section at the 1992 Cannes Film Festival.

== Cast ==
- Géza Balkay - A nyaraló
- Mari Törőcsik - A nyaraló anyja
- Marta Klubowicz - Fiatal nő
- Adél Kováts - Fiatal nő (voice)
- Juli Básti - Kocsmárosnő
- József Madaras - A kocsmárosnő férje
- Miklós Székely B. - Rendőr
- Gábor Reviczky - Sofőr
- Gábor Ferenczi
- Endre Kátay
- László Csurka
- Károly György
- János Ács
- Csaba Magyar
- Árpád Babay
- Alexandra Nagy
