= House of Charidemos =

House of Charidemos is a late-antique villa (5th-century CE), known for mosaics. Located in Halikarnassos (in the centre of modern Bodrum, Turkey, circa Coban Yildizi street and west of the west wall of the Maussolleion terrace).

Greek inscription on the floor of one of the halls indicates the owner as Charidemos:

Come hither and nod your approval
without delay with your bright shining eyes. I present a
multiform body of stones laid in mosaics, a body which skilful men
in spreading the floor made shine all over,
so that the richly wrought appearance of the high-roofed building
shall make this city renowned in many places.
What before was in a miserable state Charidemos raised
from the ground with toil and enormous expense

Some parts of the villa were first discovered by C. T. Newton in 1856 and published by him in 1862. House was excavated in 1990–1993 by a joint Danish-Turkish team.

== Bibliography ==
- R.P. Hinks, Catalogue of the Greek, Etruscan, and Roman Mosaics and Paintings in the British Museum, London 1933.
- S. Isager, Pagans in the Late Roman Halikarnassos II, Proceedings of the Danish Institute at Athens I, 1995, 209–219.
- S. Isager, The Late Roman Villa in Halikarnassos. The inscription, in: Pagans and Pavements, eds. S. Isager & B. Poulsen, Odense 1997, 24–29.
- P. Pedersen, Investigastions and Excavations in Halikarnassos 1990; in: KST XIII (Ankara 1992) 159–170.
- B. Poulsen, K. Lund Rasmussen et al.: Materials and technology of mosaics from the House of Charidemos at Halikarnassos (Bodrum, Turkey) / Heritage Science, Journal of Archaeological Science Reports 2022, 1-23.
