= Petőfi '73 =

1973 film

- Directed by: Ferenc Kardos
- Written by: Ferenc Kardos; István Kardos; Sándor Petőfi
- Produced by: István Nemeskürty
- Starring: Mihály Kovács
- Cinematography: János Kende
- Edited by: János Rózsa
- Release date: 11 January 1973
- Running time: 89 minutes
- Country: Hungary
- Language: Hungarian

Petőfi '73 is a 1973 Hungarian drama film directed by Ferenc Kardos. It was entered into the 1973 Cannes Film Festival.

== Cast ==
- Mihály Kovács - Sándor Petőfi
- Nóra Kovács - Szendrey júlia
- Can Togay - Kossuth Lajos
- Tibor Csizmadia - Vasvári Pál
- Csaba Oszkay - Madarász László
- Péter Szuhay - Görgey Artúr
- Attila Köhalmi - Jókai Mór
- Miklós Donik - Orlay Petrik Soma
- Tibor Spáda - Bem József
- Balázs Blaskó - Klapka György
- János Marosvölgyi - Dembinszky
- Zoltán Fábián - Damjanich János
- Kata Kánya
- Péter Fried
