= István Nemeskürty =

Hungarian screenwriter, film producer (1925–2015)

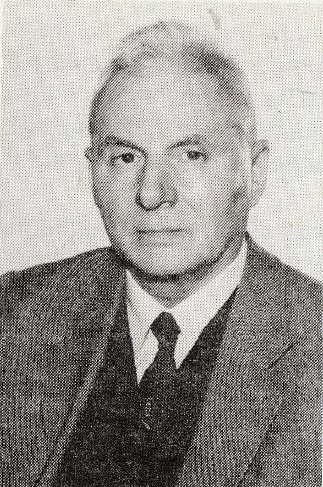
- Born: 14 May 1925; Budapest, Hungary
- Died: 8 October 2015 (aged 90); Budapest, Hungary
- Occupations: Screenwriter, film producer
- Years active: 1950-2015

István Nemeskürty (14 May 1925 – 8 October 2015) was a Hungarian historian, writer, screenwriter and film producer.

== Career ==
Nemeskürty played an important role in three major areas of Hungarian cinema: as studio head until 1984; as film historian and author of Word and Image: History of the Hungarian Cinema (Budapest: Corvina Press, 1968; revised edition 1975); and finally as head of the Hungarian Film Institute in the 2000s.

In 1977 he was a member of the jury at the 10th Moscow International Film Festival. In 1985 he was a member of the jury at the 14th Moscow International Film Festival.

== Selected filmography ==
- Stars of Eger (1968)
- Petőfi '73 (1973)
- The Conquest (1996)
- Sacra Corona (2001)
