= Agasides =

Greek athlete

Agasides was an athlete from Halicarnassus, alive in ancient times.

Having won a bronze trophy at the Doric hexapolis league games of Tropium, Agasides refused to dedicate it to the statue of Apollo as was the custom, these games being held for the honour of Apollo. He chose instead to place the trophy on the wall of his home, an act which caused discontent amongst some in Dorian cities, resulting in the excommunication of Halicarnassus.
