= The Conquest (1996 film) =

- Directed by: Gábor Koltay
- Written by: István Nemeskürty
- Produced by: Gábor Koltay
- Starring: Franco Nero; Imre Sinkovits; Tibor Bitskey; László Csurka
- Edited by: Gergely Koltay
- Music by: Gergely Koltay
- Distributed by: Mokép
- Release date: 1996
- Running time: 107 mins
- Country: Hungary
- Language: Hungarian

Honfoglalás (AKA: The Conquest) is a 1996 Hungarian film about the Magyar settlement in Hungary in approximately AD 896.

This film was written by István Nemeskürty and directed by Gábor Koltay.

== Cast ==
- Franco Nero as Árpád
- Imre Sinkovits as High Prince Álmos
- Tibor Bitskey as Előd
- László Csendes as Tétény
- László Csurka as Kond
- György Dörner as Tas
- Géza Kaszás as Ond
- Zsolt Körtvélyessy as Huba
- Zsolt Anger as Levente
- Sandor Bene as young Árpád
- László Sinkó as Saint Methodius
- Dorka Gryllus as Hajnal
- Zsuzsa Holl as Virág

== See also ==
- list of historical drama films
