= Géza Balkay =

Hungarian actor

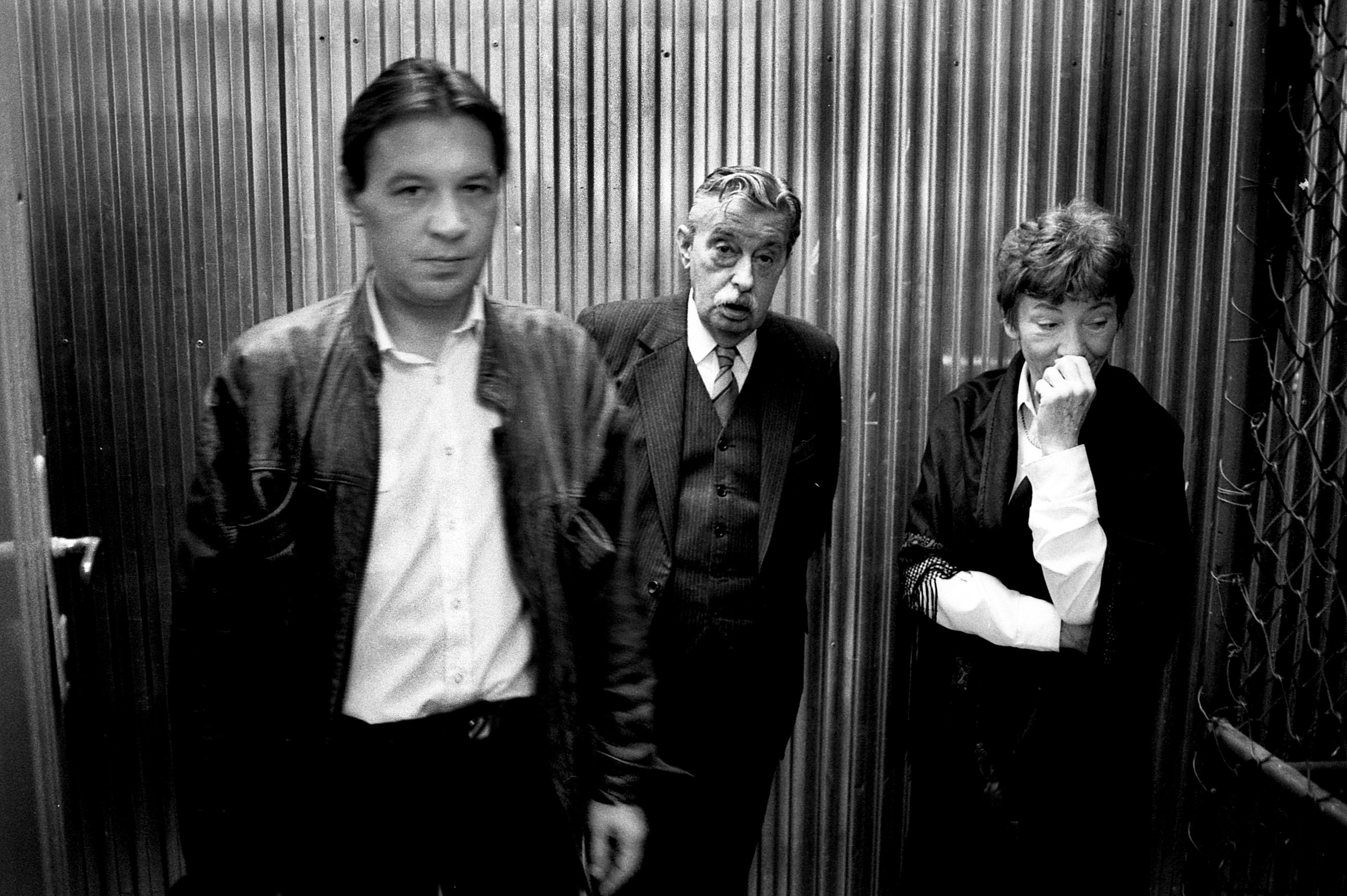
- Géza Balkay (left) with László Mensáros and Mariann Cernus
- Born: 5 September 1952; Budapest, Hungary
- Died: 3 April 2006 (aged 53)
- Occupation: Actor
- Years active: 1976-2006

Géza Balkay (5 September 1952 – 3 April 2006) was a Hungarian television and film actor. He appeared in more than 40 films and television shows between 1976 and 2006. He starred in The Summer Guest, which was screened in the Un Certain Regard section at the 1992 Cannes Film Festival.

== Selected filmography ==
- Red Heat (1988) - Colonel Kulikov
- The Summer Guest (1992)
