= Jean-Marie Zemb =

French linguist

Jean-Marie Zemb (14 July 1928 – 15 February 2007) was a French linguist.
