= Ferenc Kardos =

Hungarian film director (1937–1999)

- Born: 4 December 1937; Galanta, Hungary
- Died: 6 March 1999 (aged 61); Budapest, Hungary
- Occupations: Film director Film producer Screenwriter
- Years active: 1959 - 1997

Ferenc Kardos (4 December 1937 – 6 March 1999) was a Hungarian film director, producer and screenwriter. He directed 23 films between 1959 and 1997. His 1973 film, Petőfi '73, was entered into the 1973 Cannes Film Festival.

== Selected filmography ==
- Petőfi '73 (1973)
- Foetus (1994)
- The Witman Boys (1997)
