= Bodrum Castle =

Castle in Bodrum, Turkey

- Muğla Province in Turkey
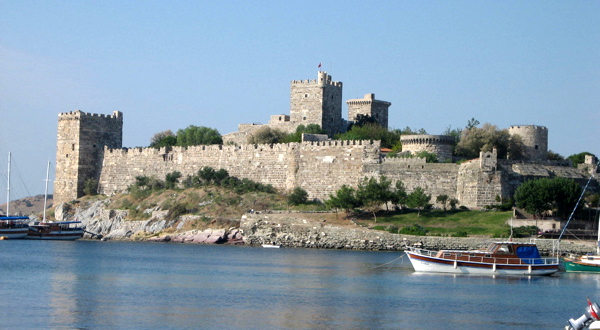
- The castle from the south-east

Location
- Coordinates: 37°1′54″N 27°25′46″E

Bodrum Castle (Turkish: Bodrum Kalesi) is a historical fortification located in southwest Turkey in the port city of Bodrum, built from 1402 onwards, by the Knights of St John (Knights Hospitaller) as the Castle of St. Peter or Petronium. A transnational effort, it has four towers known as the English, French, German, and Italian towers, bearing the names of the nations responsible for their construction. The chapel was built around 1407 and the first walls completed in 1437. The castle started reconstruction in the late 15th century, only to be taken over by the Islamic Ottoman Empire in 1523. The chapel was converted to a mosque, and a minaret was added. The castle remained under the empire for almost 400 years. After remaining empty following World War I, in the early 1960s, the castle became the home for the Bodrum Museum of Underwater Archaeology. In 2016 it was inscribed in the UNESCO Tentative list of World Heritage Sites in Turkey.

== History ==
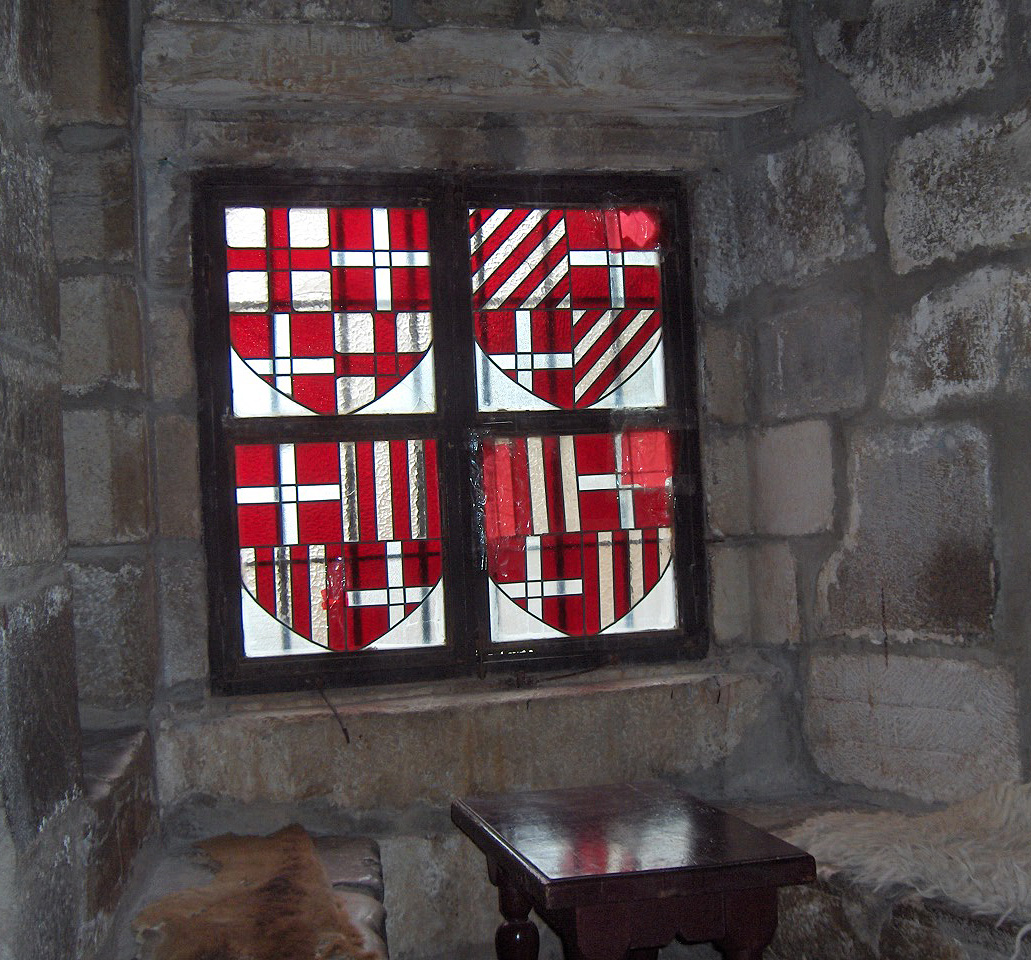
Stained-glass Knights Hospitaller coats of arms in the English Tower.

Confronted by the now firmly established Ottoman Sultanate, the Knights Hospitaller, whose headquarters were on the island of Rhodes, needed another stronghold on the mainland. Grand Master Philibert de Naillac (1396–1421) identified a suitable site across from the island of Kos, where a castle had already been built by the Order. Its location was the site of a fortification in Doric times (1110 BC) as well as of a small Seljuk castle in the 11th century. The same promontory is also the probable site of the Palace of Mausolos, the famous King of Caria. In his travel diary Travels In Asia Minor, Charles Boileau Elliot describes this palace as the Palace of Mausolus with absolute certainty, and this account was written in the year 1840.

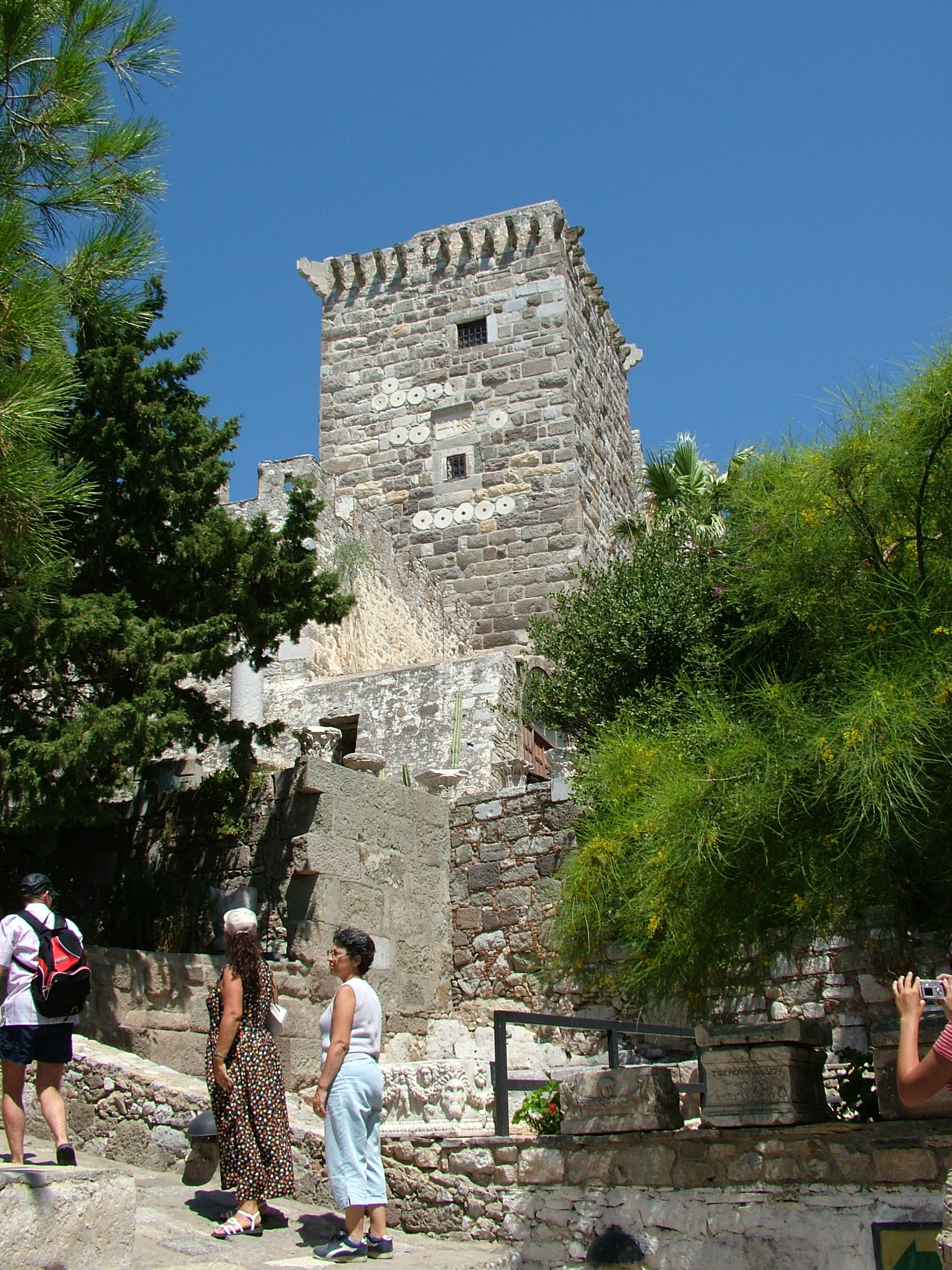
The French Tower.

The construction of the castle began in 1404 under the supervision of the German knight architect Heinrich Schlegelholt. Construction workers were guaranteed a reservation in heaven by a Papal Decree of 1409. They used squared green volcanic stone, marble columns and reliefs from the nearby Mausoleum of Halicarnassus to fortify the castle.

The first walls were completed in 1437. The chapel was among the first completed inner structures (probably 1406). It consists of a vaulted nave and an apse. The chapel was reconstructed in Gothic style by Spanish Knights of Malta in 1519–1520. Their names can be found on two cornerstones of the façade. Fourteen cisterns for collecting rainwater were excavated in the rocks under the castle.

Each langue of the Order had its own tower, each in its own style. Each tongue, each headed by a Bailiff, was responsible for the maintenance and defense of a specific portion of the fortress and for manning it with sufficient numbers of knights and soldiers. There were seven gates leading to the inner part of the fortress.

The architect applied the latest features in castle design; the passages leading to the gates were full of twists and turns. Eventual assailants could not find cover against the arrows, stones or heated projectiles they had to confront. The knights had placed above the gates and on the walls hundreds of painted coats of arms and carved reliefs. Two hundred and forty-nine separate designs still remain, including those of grand masters, castle commandants, countries, and personal coat of arms of knights and religious figures.

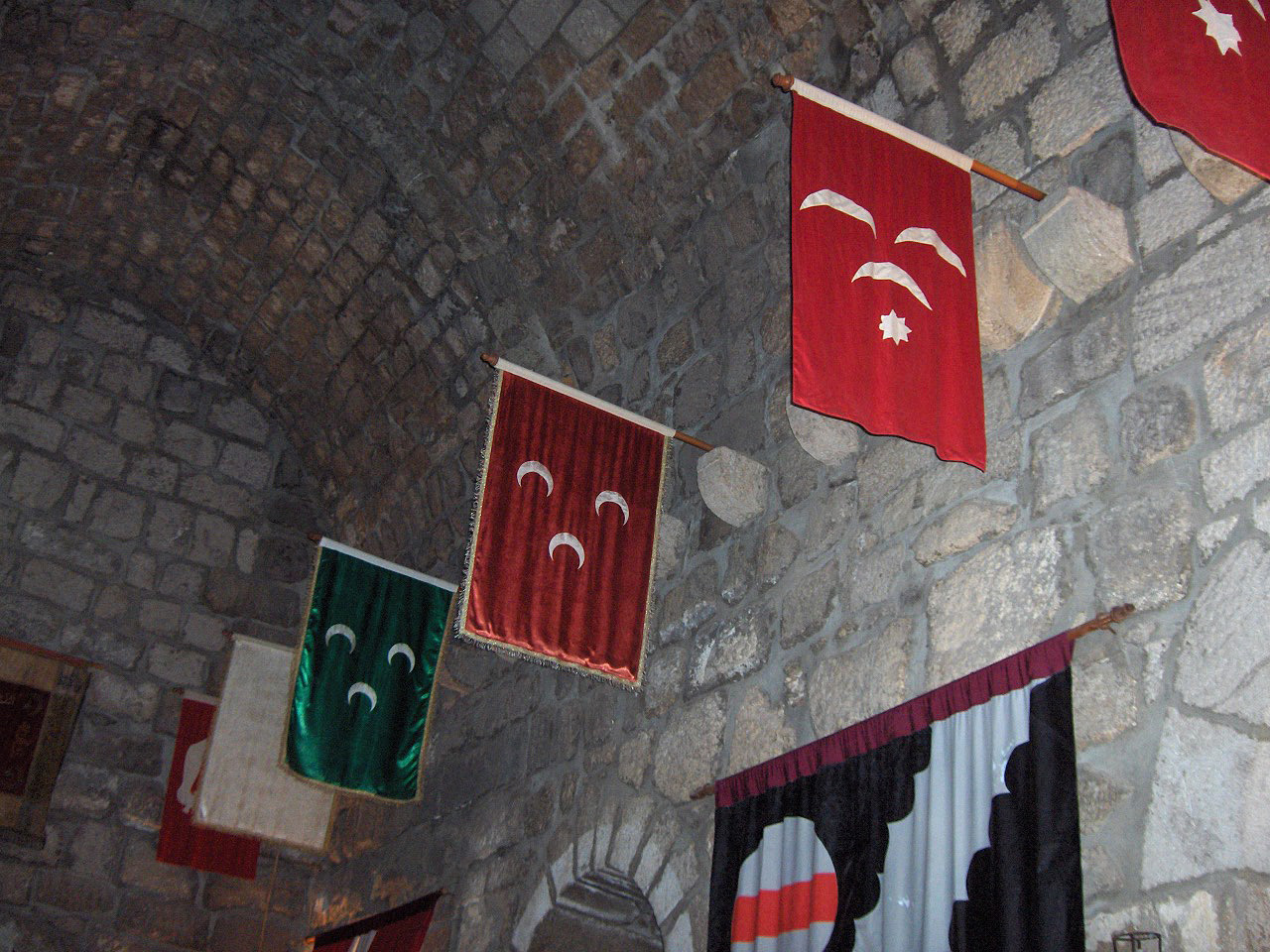
Ottoman banners hanging in the English Tower.

The construction of the three-storied English tower was finished in 1413. One door opens to the north, to the inner part of the castle, while the other leads to the western rampart. One could only access this tower via a drawbridge. The western façade shows an antique carved relief of a lion. Because of this relief, the tower was also called "the Lion Tower". Above this lion, one can see the coat of arms of King Henry IV of England.

For over a century St. Peter's Castle remained the second most important castle of the Order. It served as a refuge for all Christians in Asia Minor.

The castle came under attack with the rise of the Ottoman Empire, first after the fall of Constantinople in 1453 and again in 1480 by Sultan Mehmed II. The attacks were repelled by the Knights of St John. In 1482, Prince Cem Sultan, son of Sultan Mehmed II and brother of Sultan Bayezid II, sought refuge in the castle, after a failure in raising a revolt against his brother.

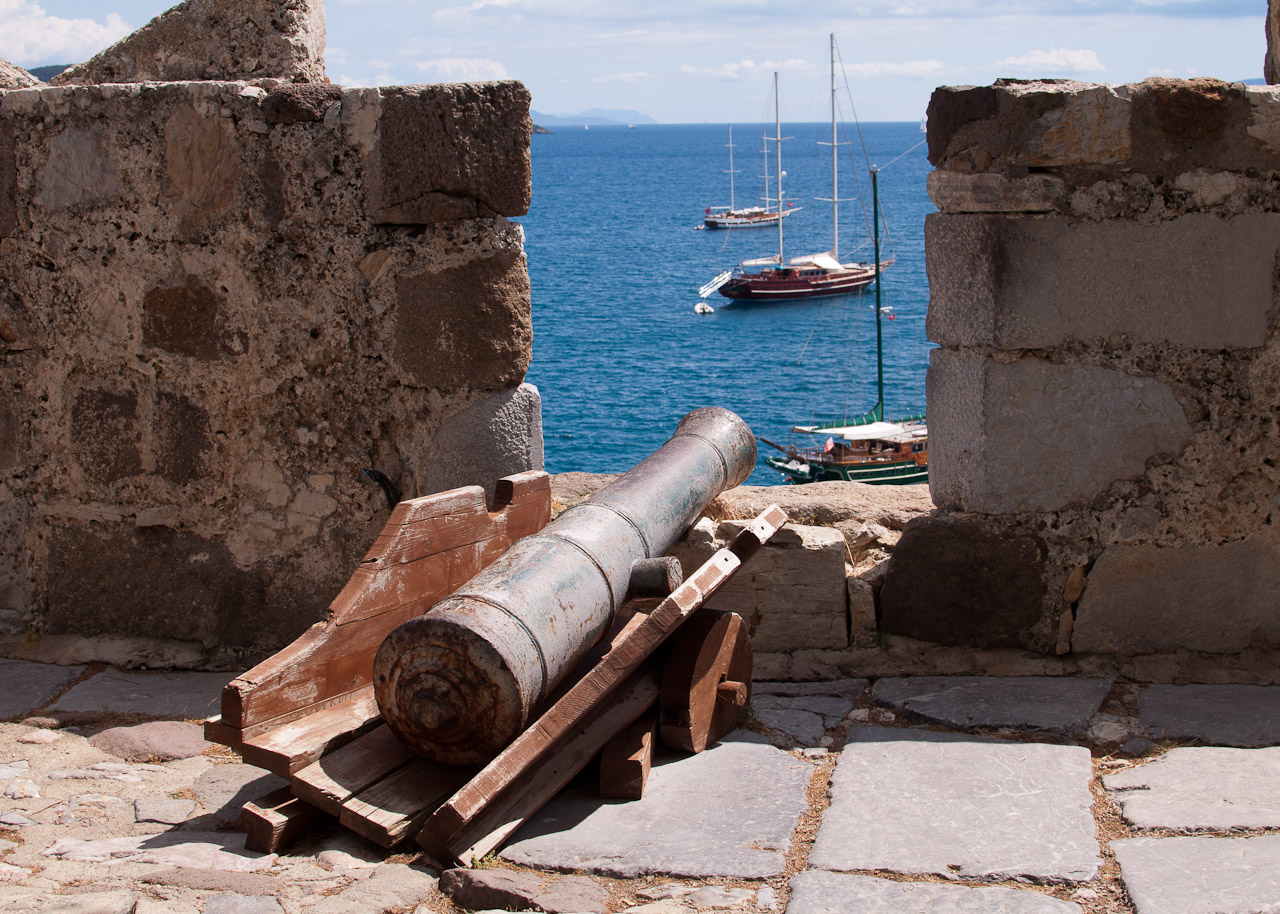
A disused cannon.

When the Knights decided to fortify the castle in 1494, they used stones from the Mausoleum once again. The walls facing the mainland were thickened in order to withstand the increasing destructive power of cannon. The walls facing the sea were less thick, since the Order had little to fear from a sea attack due to their powerful naval fleet. Grand Master Fabrizio del Carretto (1513–21) built a round bastion to strengthen the land side of the fortress. Sir Thomas Docwra was appointed Captain of the Castle in 1499.

=== 16th century ===
Between 1505 and 1507 the few sculptures from the mausoleum that had not been smashed and burnt for lime were integrated into the castle for decoration. These included twelve slabs of the Amazonomachy (combat between Amazons and Greeks) and a single block of the Centauromachy, a few standing lions, and one running leopard.

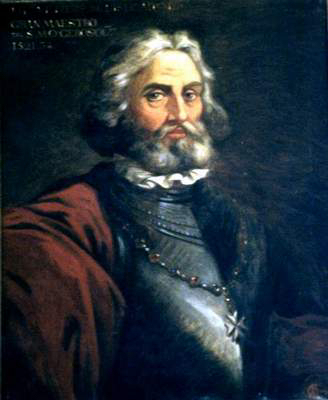
Philippe Villiers, who ordered the Castle to be fortified.

When faced with an attack from Sultan Suleiman, Philippe Villiers de L'Isle-Adam, the Grand Master of the Knights Hospitallers, ordered the Castle to be strengthened again. Much of the remaining portions of the mausoleum were broken up and used as building material to fortify the castle. By 1522 almost every block of the mausoleum had been removed.

In June 1522 the sultan attacked the Order's headquarters in Rhodes from the Bay of Marmaris with 200,000 soldiers (Siege of Rhodes (1522)). The castle of Rhodes fell in December 1522. The terms of surrender included the handing over of the Knights' fortresses in Kos and St Peter's Castle in Bodrum.

After the surrender, the chapel was converted into a mosque and a minaret was added. This mosque was called the Süleymaniye Camii, as attested by a traveler, Evliya Chelebi, who visited Bodrum in 1671. The minaret was destroyed on 26 May 1915 by rounds fired by a French warship during World War I. It was reconstructed in its original shape in 1997.

=== 19th century ===
In 1846 Lord Canning, HM Ambassador to Constantinople, obtained permission to remove twelve marble reliefs showing a combat between Greeks and Amazons from the castle. Sir Charles Newton, a member of the staff of the British Museum, conducted excavations and removed a number of stone lions and one leopard in 1856. These are all still to be found today at the British Museum.

In later years, the castle has been used for different purposes. It was used as a military base by the Turkish Army during the Greek Revolt in 1824. In the 19th century, the chapel which had been converted for use as a mosque had a minaret added. At the same time, a hamam (public bath) was installed in the castle. In 1895 the castle was turned into a prison. During World War I, the castle was fired upon by a French warship, toppling the minaret and damaging several towers. After the Great War, the Italians established a garrison in the castle but withdrew in 1921 when Mustafa Kemal Atatürk came to power, when the castle stood empty for 40 years.

== Museum of Underwater Archaeology ==
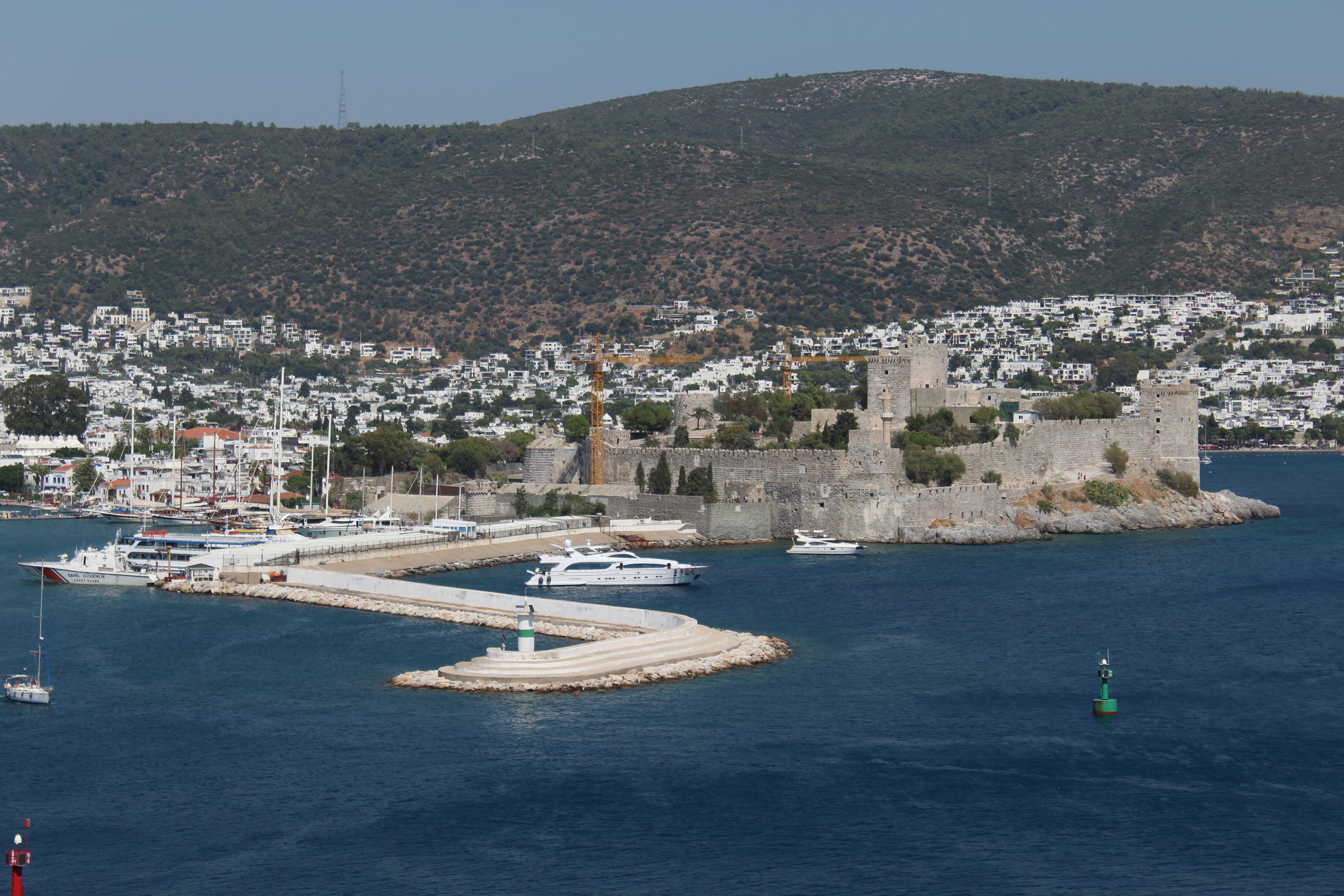
Bodrum Castle in 2020.

In 1962 the Turkish Government decided to turn the castle into a museum for the underwater discoveries of ancient shipwrecks in the Aegean Sea. This has become the Bodrum Museum of Underwater Archaeology, with a collection of amphoras, ancient glass, bronze, clay, and iron items. It is the biggest museum of its kind devoted to underwater archaeology. Most of its collection dates from underwater excavations carried out by the Institute of Nautical Archaeology (INA) after 1960. These excavations were performed on several shipwrecks:

- Finike-Gelidonya shipwreck (12th century BC): 1958–1959; first underwater excavation in Turkey
- Bodrum-Yassiada shipwreck (Byzantine, 7th century AD): 1961–1964; Roman merchant vessel with 900 amphoras
- Bodrum -Yassiada shipwreck (Late Roman, 4th century AD)
- Bodrum-Yassiada shipwreck (Ottoman, 16th century AD) (dated by a 16th-century four-real silver coin from Seville (Philip II) )
- Ṣeytan Deresi shipwreck (16th century BC)
- Serçe Limanı Shipwreck (glass, 11th century AD): 1977; collection of Islamic glassware
- Marmaris-Serçe harbour shipwreck (Hellenistic, 3rd BC)
- Kaṣ-Uluburun shipwreck (14th century BC): 1982–1995; 10 tons of Cypriot copper ingots; one ton of pure tin ingots; 150 glass ingots; manufactured goods; Mycenaean pottery; Egyptian seals (with a seal of queen Nefertiti) and jewelry
- Tektaṣ Burnu Classical Greek shipwreck (5th century BC): 1999–2001

The former chapel houses an exhibition of vases and amphoras form the Mycenaean age (14th to 12th centuries BC) and findings from the Bronze Age (around 2500 BC). The commercial amphoras give a historical overview of the development of amphoras and their varied uses.

The Italian Tower houses a collection spanning many centuries in the Coin and Jewelry Hall. Another exhibition room is devoted exclusively to the tomb of a Carian princess, who died between 360 and 325 BC. The collection of ancient glass objects is one of the four largest ancient glass collections in the world.

Finally, two ancient shipwrecks have been reconstructed: the Fatımi ship, sunk in 1077 AD, and the large Uluburun Shipwreck from the 14th century BC.

A garden inside the castle is a collection of almost every plant and tree of the Mediterranean region, including both the myrtle, and the plane tree. Turquoise and amber peacocks parade under flowering trees and bushes. From the towers it is possible to see the entire city as well as some of the neighboring bays.

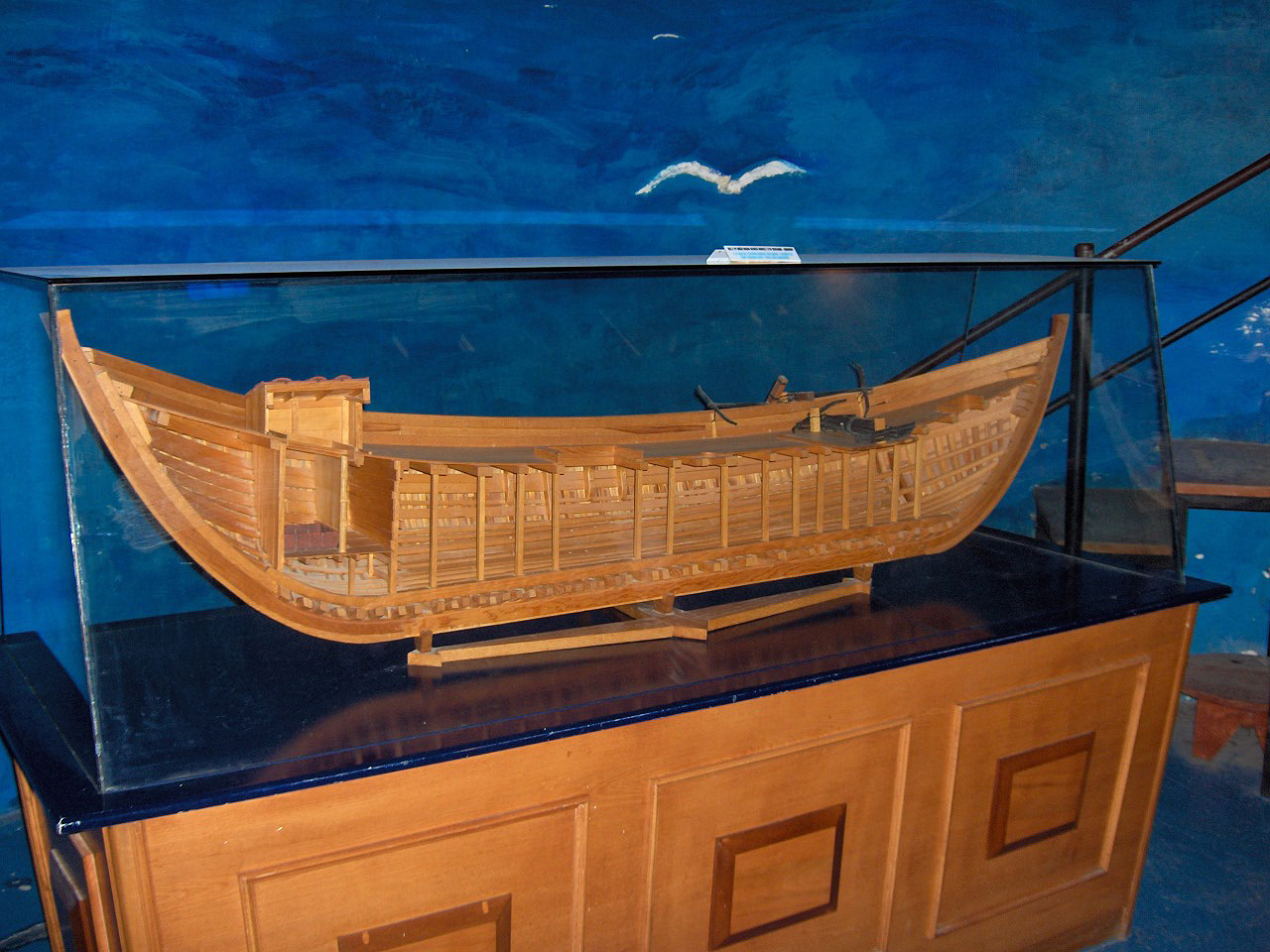
Model of the Yassiada vessel (Byzantine, 7th century)

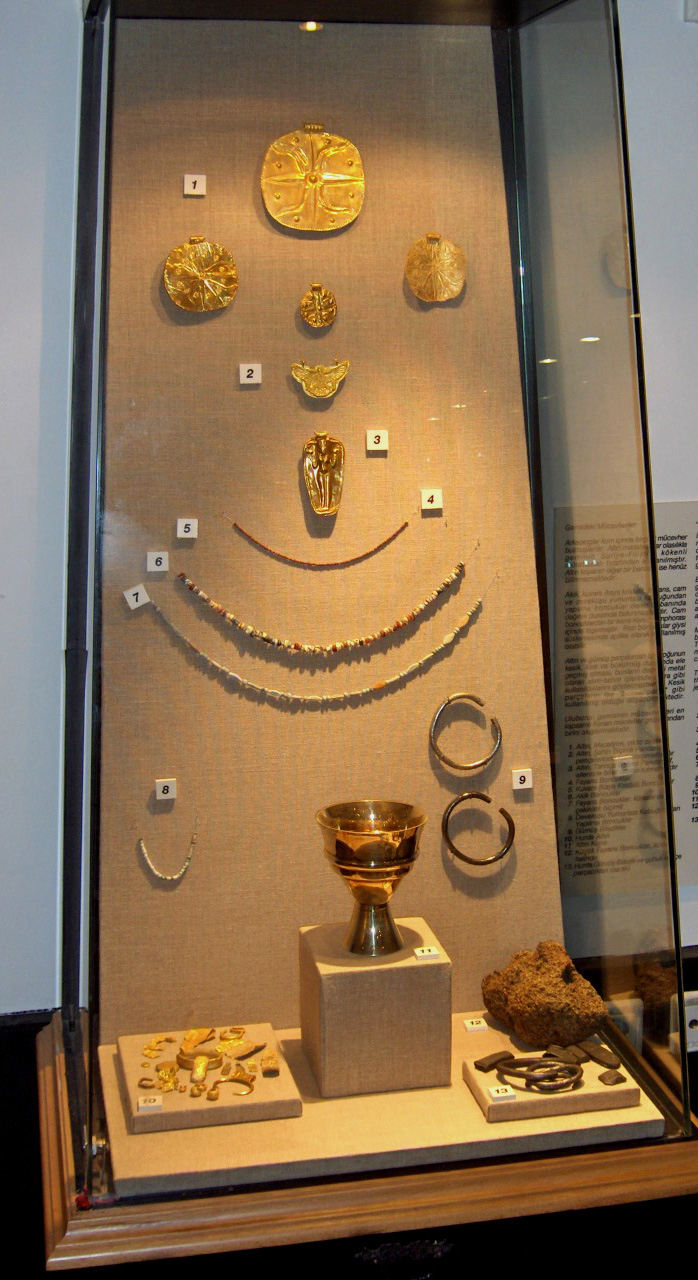
Egyptian jewelry (Uluburun shipwreck)

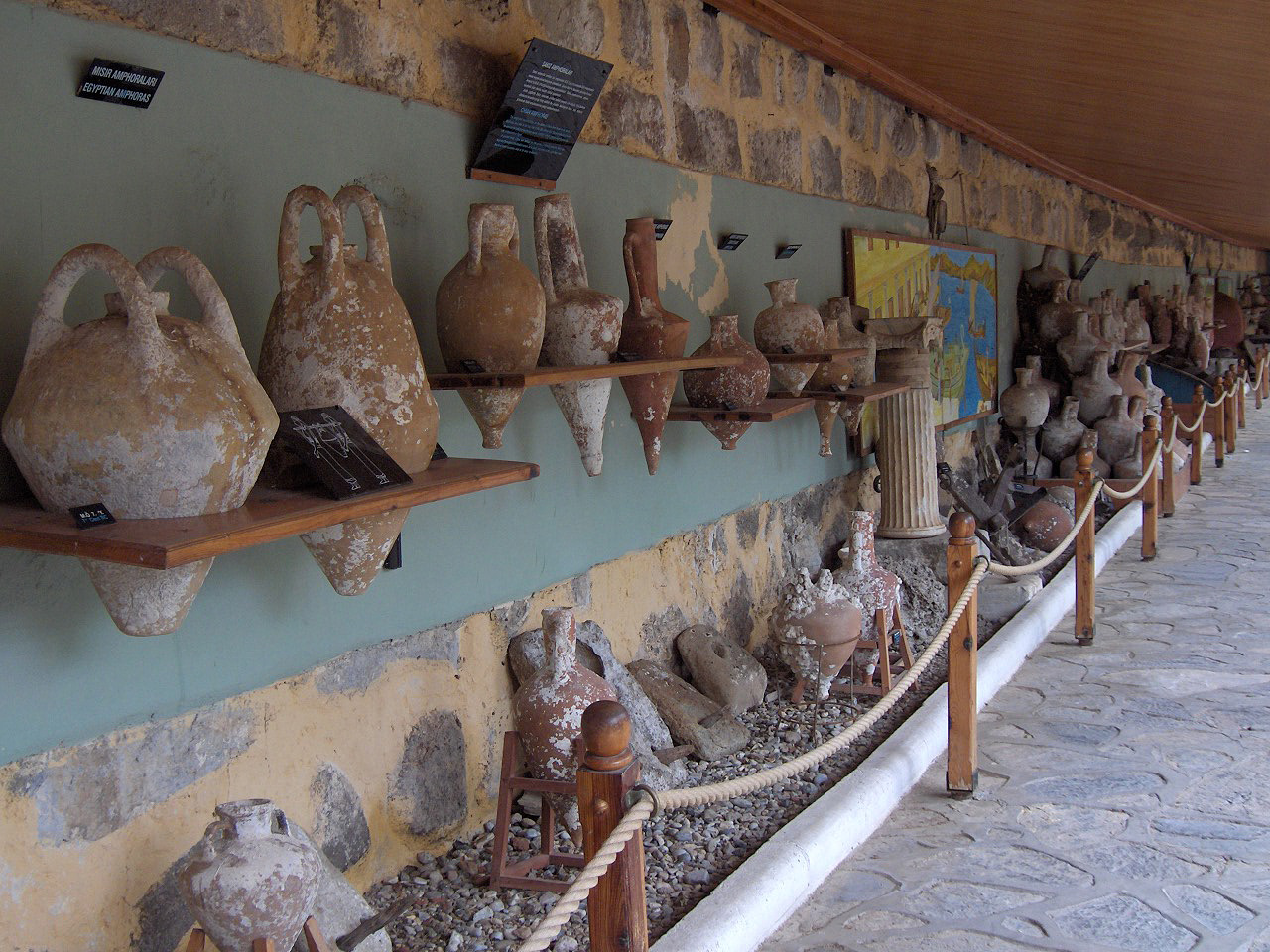
Collection of amphoras from different parts of the Mediterranean

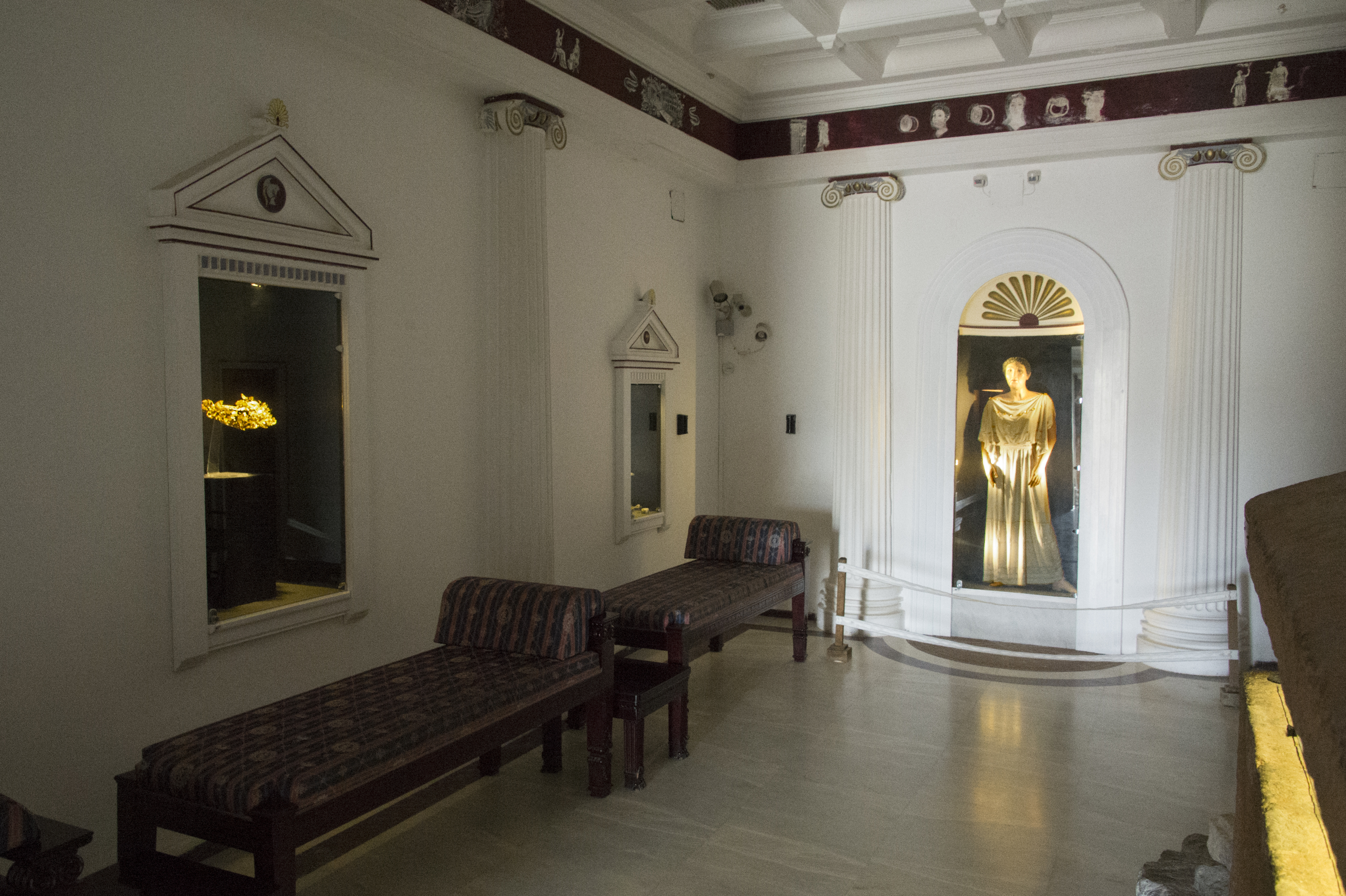
Bodrum Museum Carian Princess 3656

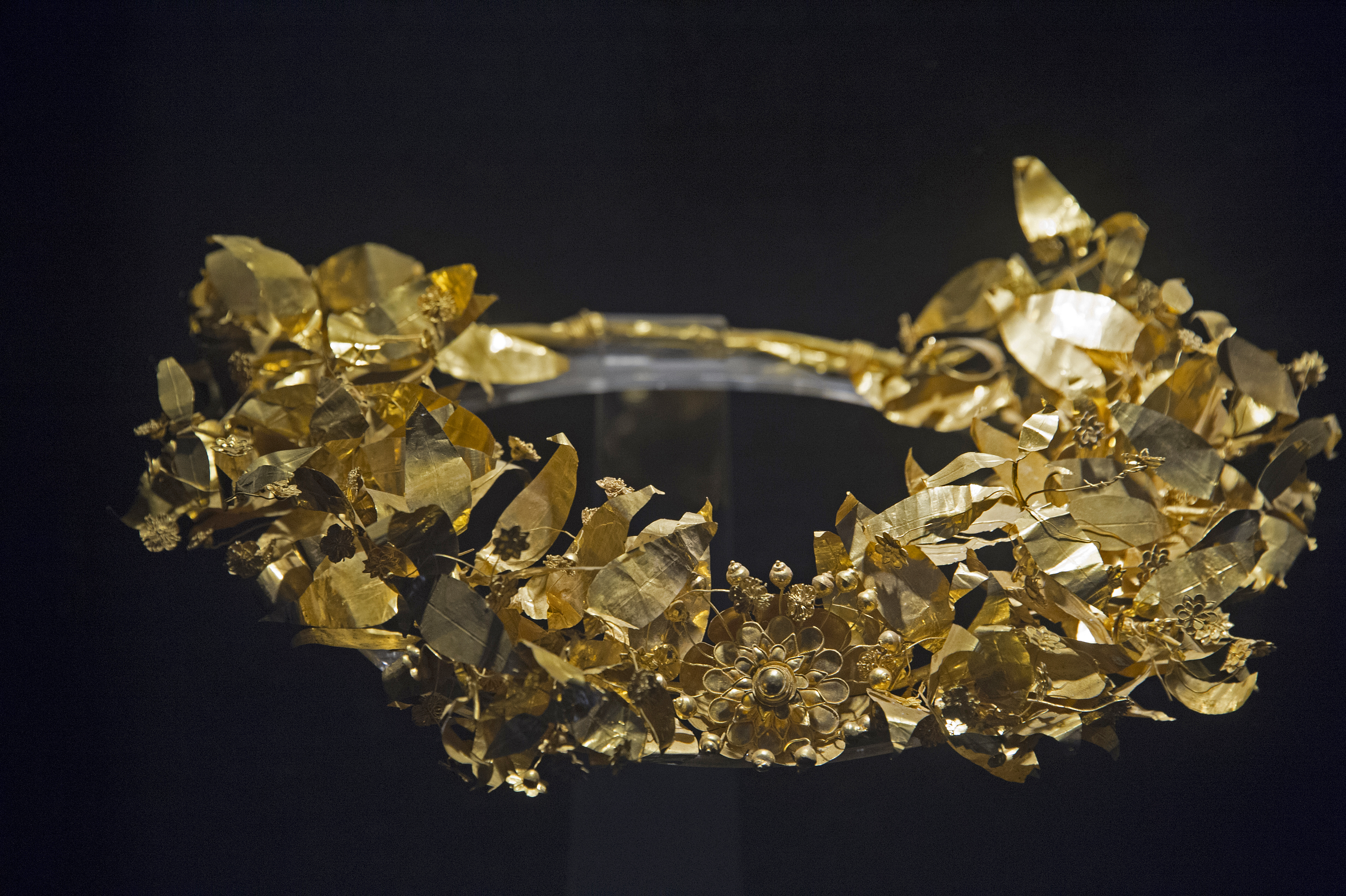
Bodrum Museum Carian Princess 3664

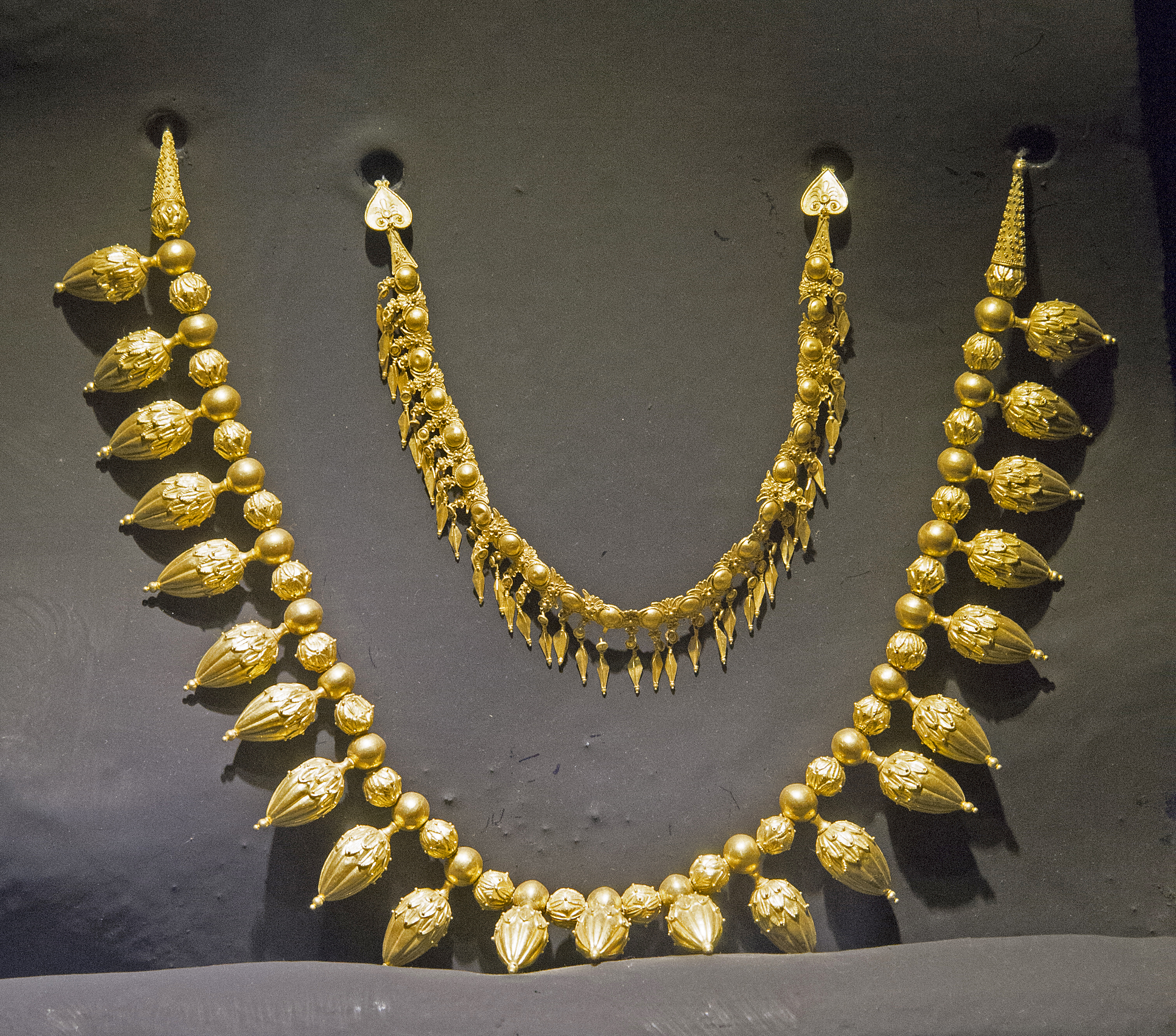
Bodrum Museum Carian Princess 3661

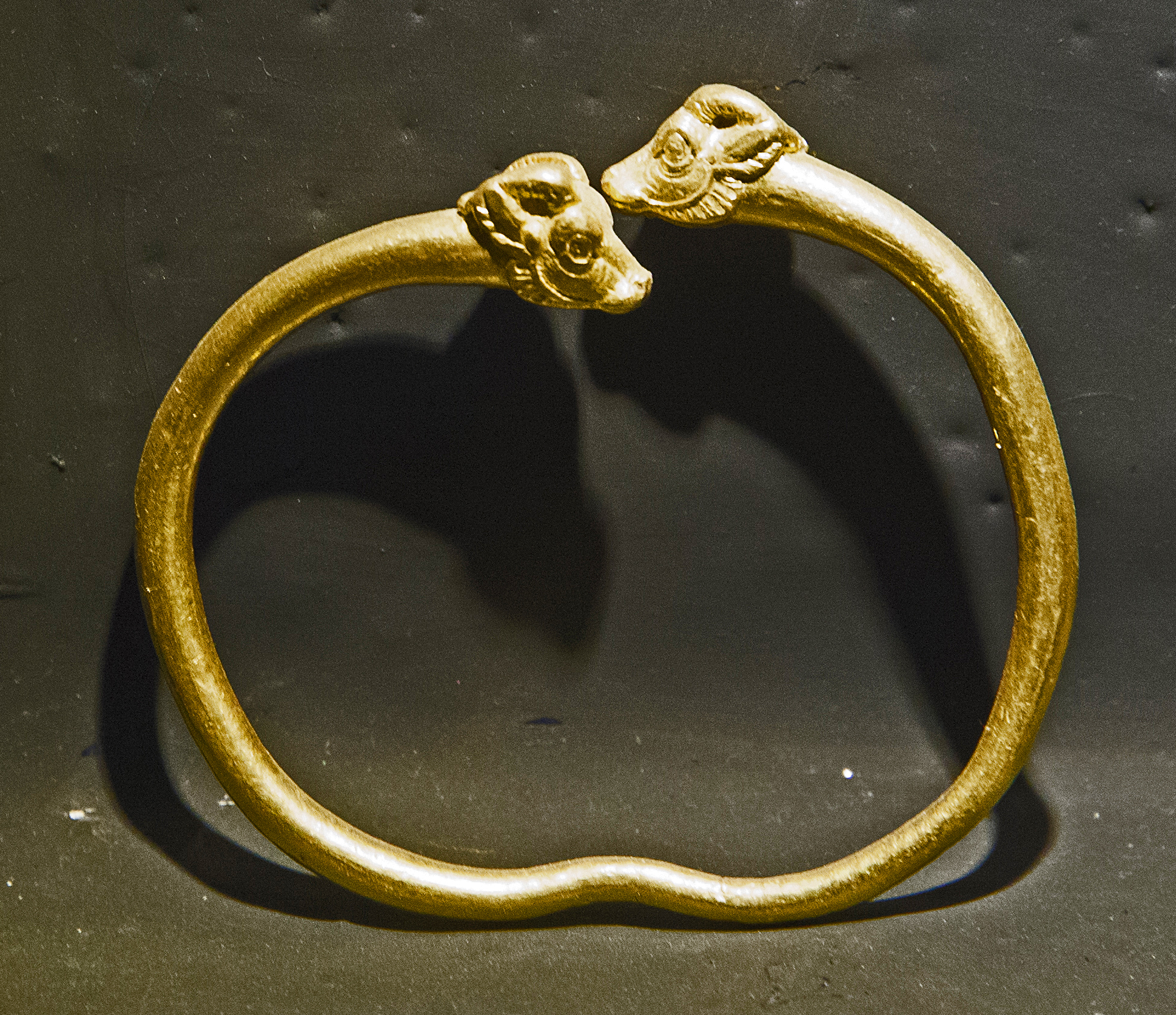
Bodrum Museum Carian Princess 3659

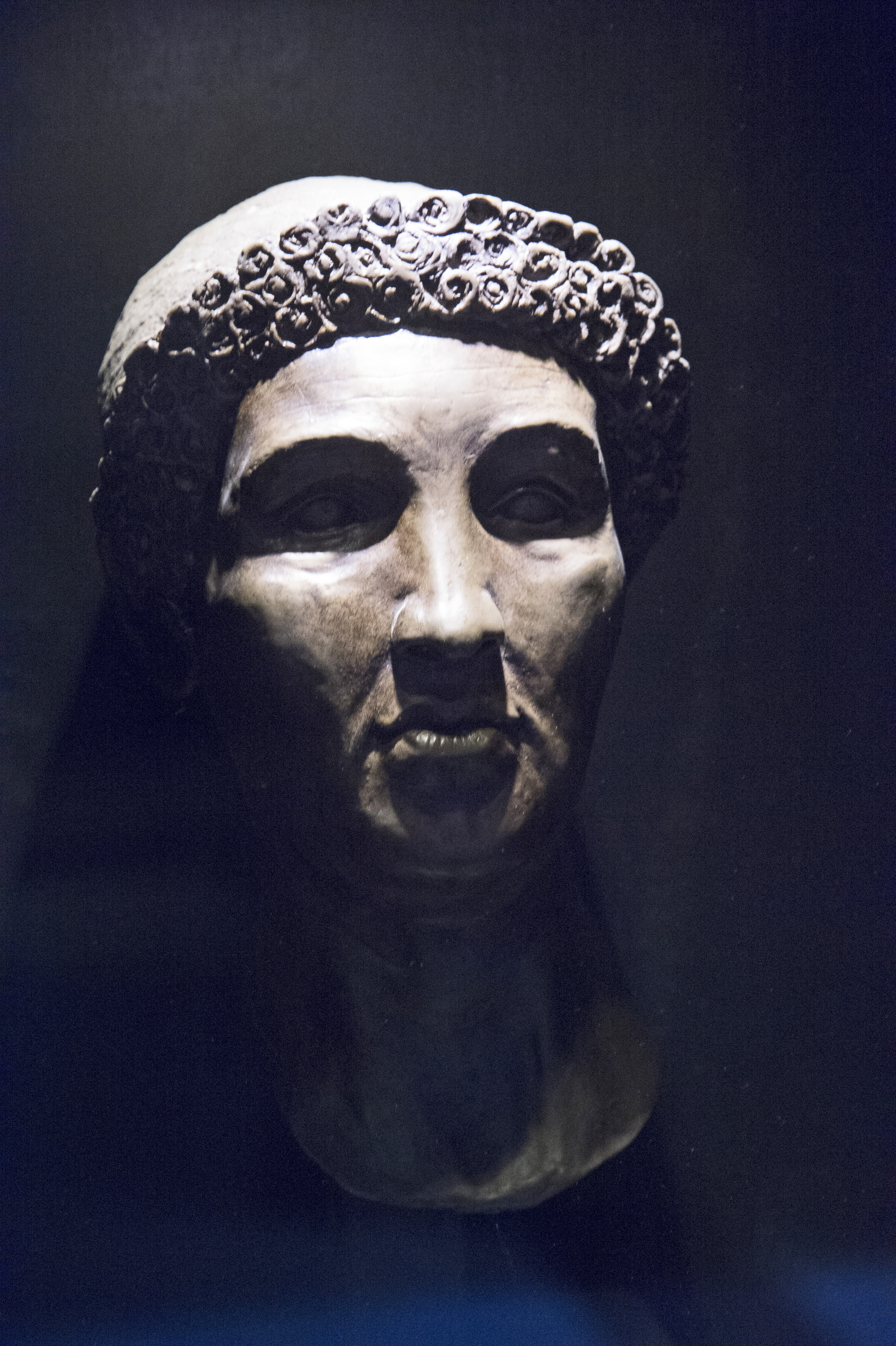
Bodrum Museum Carian Princess 3665

== See also ==
- Halicarnassus
- Uluburun Shipwreck
- Order of Malta
