= Halicarnassus =

Ancient Carian city, present day Bodrum in Turkey

- alos k̂arnos 𐊠𐊣𐊫𐊰 𐊴𐊠𐊥𐊵𐊫𐊰 (in Carian); Ἁλικαρνασσός (in Ancient Greek); Halikarnas (in Turkish)
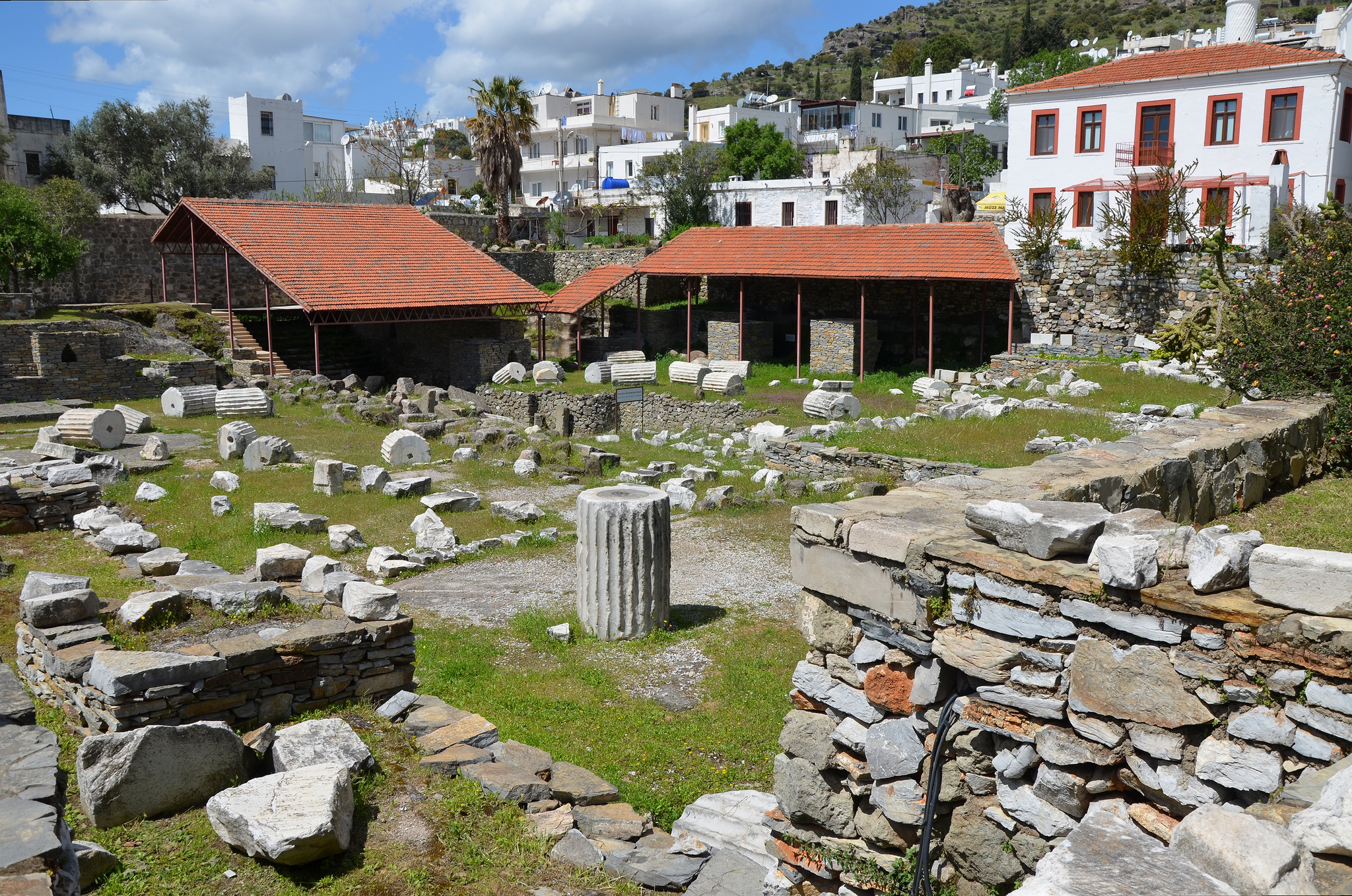
- The ruins of the Mausoleum at Halicarnassus, one of the Seven Wonders of the Ancient World.

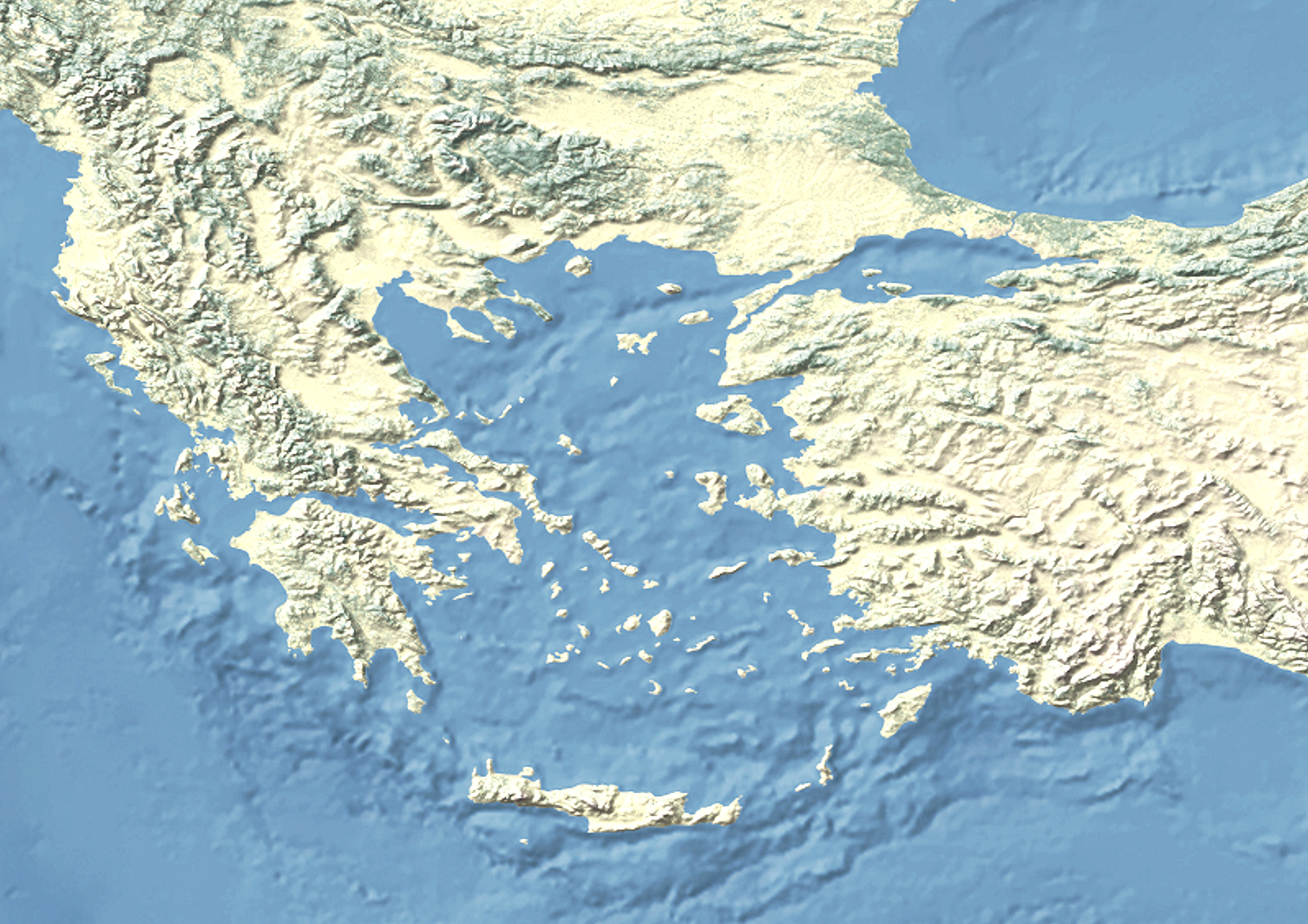
- Location within Turkey Location within The Aegean Sea area
- 37°02′16″N 27°25′27″E
- Type: Settlement
- Associated with: Herodotus, Dionysius
- Location: Bodrum, Muğla Province, Turkey
- Region: Caria

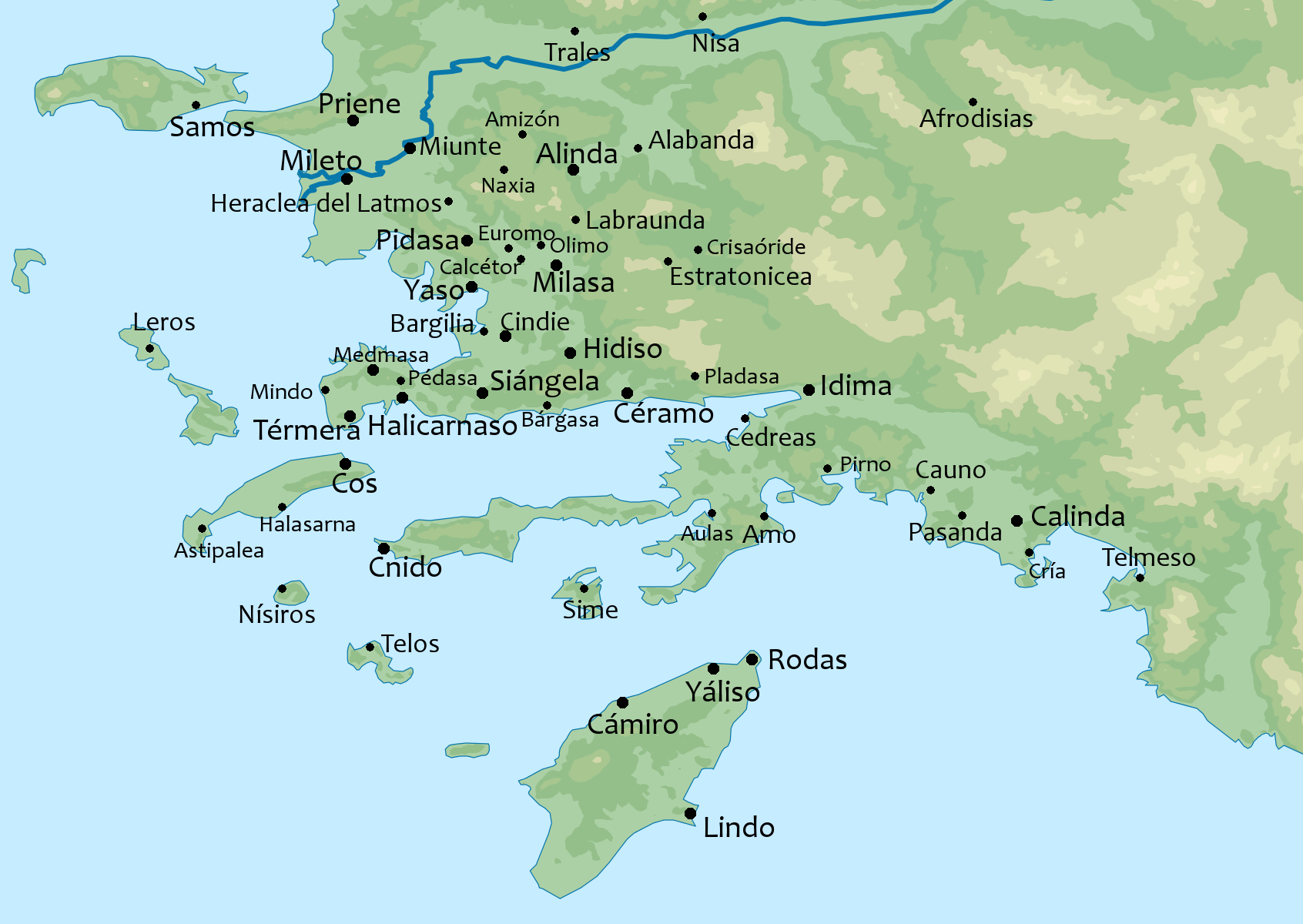
Ancient cities of Caria

Halicarnassus (Note: /ˌhælɪkɑːrˈnæsəs/ HAL-ih-kar-NASS-əs; Latin: Halicarnassus or Halicarnāsus; Ancient Greek: Ἁλικαρνασσός, romanized: Halikarnāssós [ha.li.kar.naːs.sós]; Turkish: Halikarnas; Carian: 𐊠𐊣𐊫𐊰 𐊴𐊠𐊥𐊵𐊫𐊰, romanized: alos k̂arnos) was an ancient city in Caria, in Anatolia. It was located in southwest Caria, on an advantageous site on the Gulf of Gökova, which is now in Bodrum, Turkey. The city was famous for the Mausoleum of Halicarnassus, also known simply as the Tomb of Mausolus, whose name provided the origin of the word "mausoleum". The mausoleum, built from 353 to 350 BC, ranked as one of the seven wonders of the ancient world.

Halicarnassus' history was unique on two interlinked issues. Halicarnassus retained a monarchical system of government at a time when most other Greek city states had long since rid themselves of their kings. Secondly, while their Ionian neighbours rebelled against Persian rule, Halicarnassus remained loyal to them. It formed part of the Persian Empire until Alexander the Great captured it at the siege of Halicarnassus in 333 BC.

Zephyria was the original name of the settlement, and the present site of the great Castle of St. Peter built by the Knights of Rhodes in 1404 AD. It was built on what was originally an island, which gradually expanded to include several Carian settlements on the mainland. However, in the course of time, the island topographically united with the mainland, and the city was extended to combine with the existing Salmacis, an older town of the native Leleges and Carians, and site of the later citadel. The first settlers were originally Dorians from the Peloponnese.

== Etymology ==
The suffix -ασσός (-assós) of Greek Ἁλικαρνασσός is indicative of a substrate toponym, meaning that an original pre-Greek name influenced, or established the place's name (compare Parnassus). In a 2015 article, linguist and philologist Ilya Yakubovich proposed that the element -καρνασσός is cognate with Luwian (CASTRUM)ha+ra/i-na-sà / (CASTRUM)ha+ra/i-ni-sà 'fortress'. If so, the toponym is probably borrowed from Carian, a Luwic language spoken alongside Greek in Halicarnassus. The Carian name for Halicarnassus has been tentatively identified with 𐊠𐊣𐊫𐊰 𐊴𐊠𐊥𐊵𐊫𐊰 (alos k̂arnos) in inscriptions.

== History ==
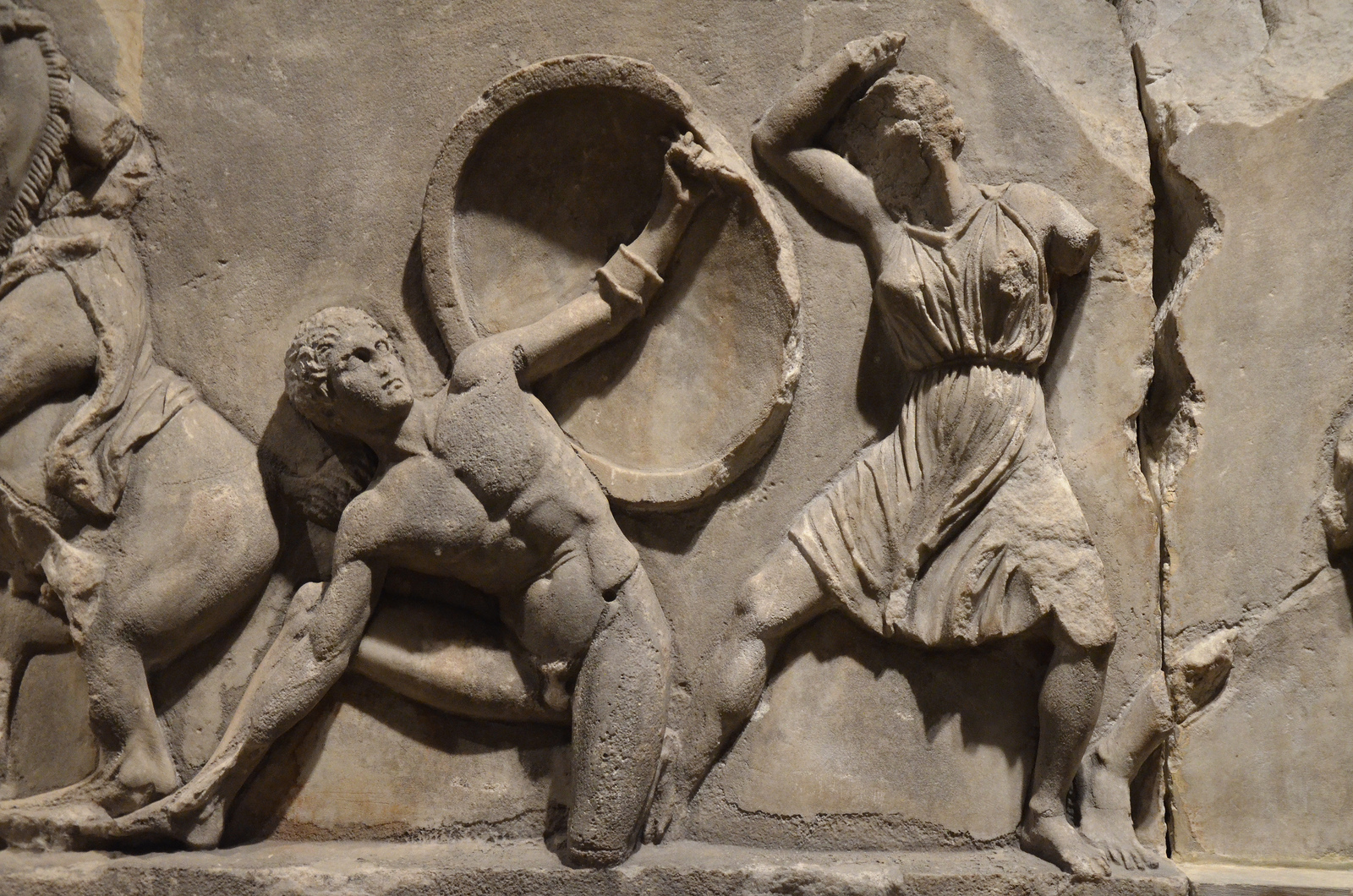
Relief of an Amazonomachy from the Mausoleum at Halicarnassus.

=== Late Bronze ===
==== Mycenaean period ====
Some large Mycenaean tombs have been found at Musgebi (or Muskebi, modern Ortakent), not far from Halicarnassus. According to Turkish archaeologist Yusuf Boysal, the Muskebi material, dating from the end of the fifteenth century BC to ca. 1200 BC, provides evidence of the presence, in this region, of a Mycenaean settlement.

More than forty burial places dating back to that time have been discovered. A rich collection of artifacts found in these tombs is now housed in the Bodrum Castle. These finds cast some light on the problem of determining the territories of ancient Arzawa and Ahhiyawa.

=== Iron Age ===
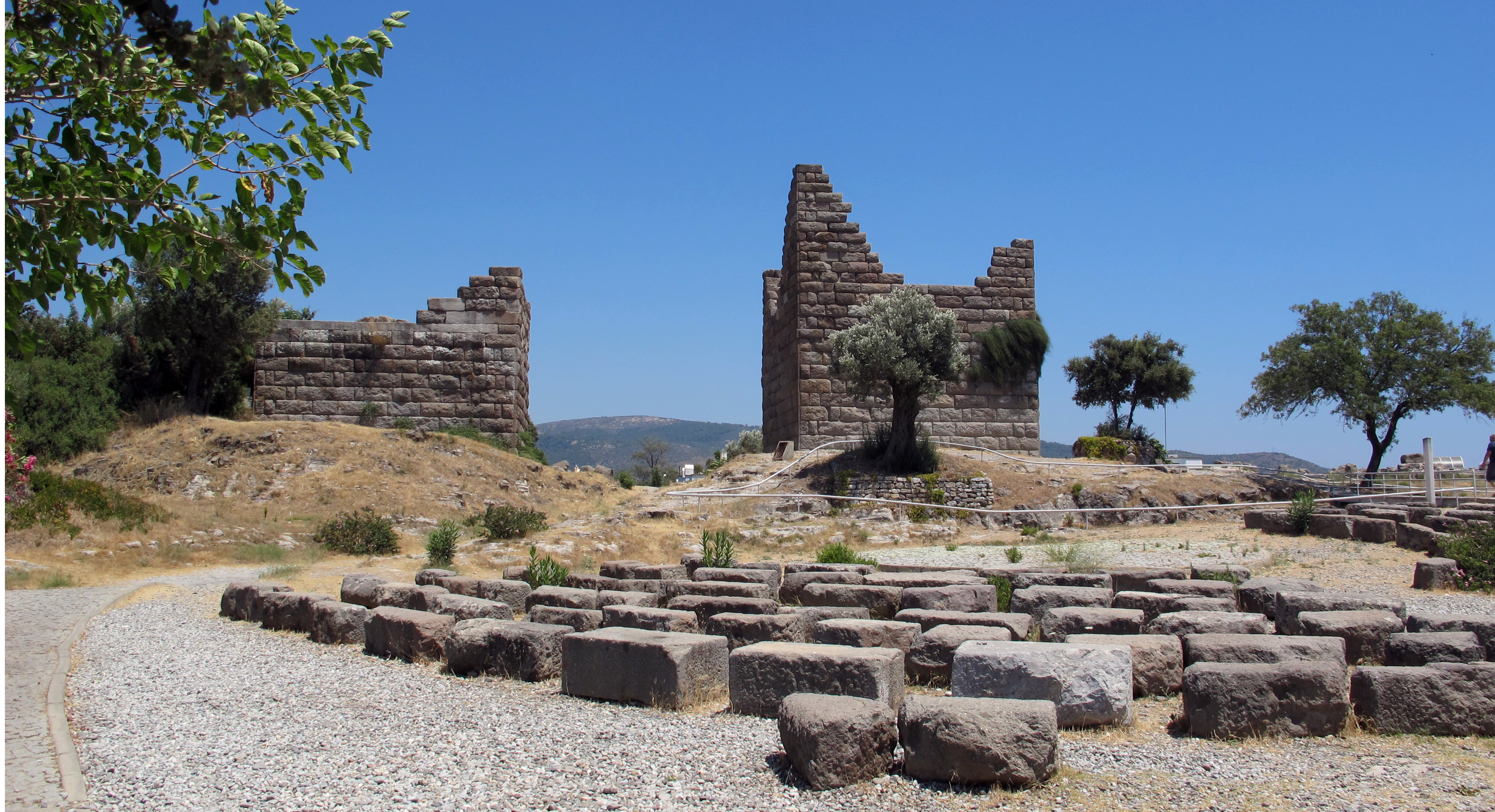
Myndos Gate. Ruins of the fortifications of Halicarnassus (modern Bodrum); 4th c. BC;

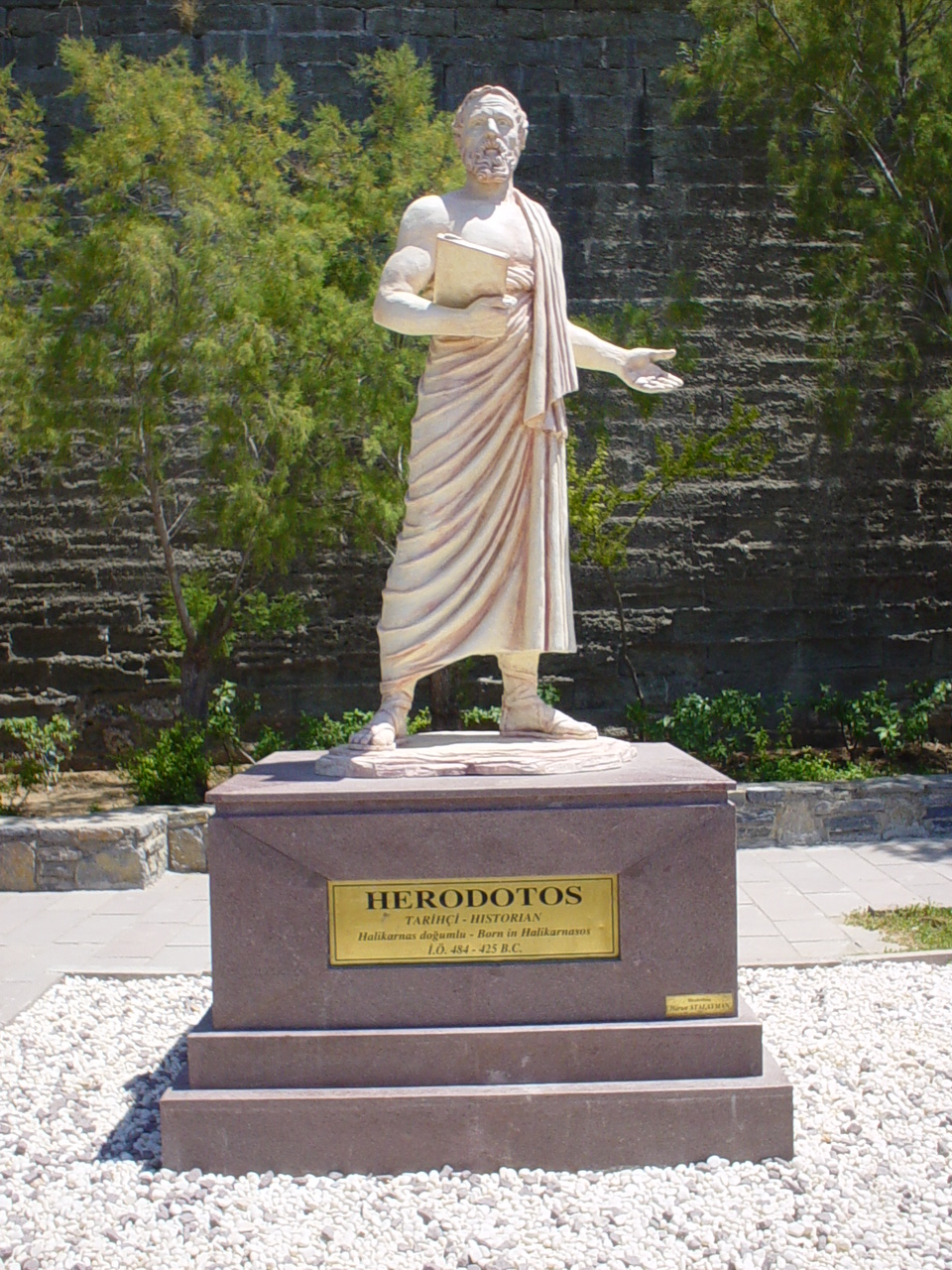
Herodotus (Greek: Ἡρόδοτος) is honored with a statue in his home of Halicarnassus (modern Bodrum).

The founding of Halicarnassus is debated among various traditions; but they agree on the main point as to it being a Dorian colony, and the figures on its coins, such as the head of Medusa, Athena or Poseidon, or the trident, support the claim that the mother cities were Troezen and Argos. The inhabitants appear to have accepted Anthes, a son of Poseidon, as their legendary founder, as mentioned by Strabo, and were proud of the title of Antheadae.

At an early period Halicarnassus was a member of the Doric Hexapolis, which included Kos, Cnidus, Lindos, Kameiros and Ialysus; but it was expelled from the league when one of its citizens, Agasicles, took home the prize tripod which he had won in the Triopian games, instead of dedicating it according to custom to the Triopian Apollo. In the early 5th century BC Halicarnassus was under the sway of Artemisia I of Caria (also known as Artemesia of Halicarnassus), who made herself famous as a naval commander at the battle of Salamis. Of Pisindalis, her son and successor, little is known. Artemisia's grandson Lygdamis II of Halicarnassus, is notorious for having put to death the poet Panyasis and causing Herodotus, possibly the best known Halicarnassian, to leave his native city (c. 457 BC).

=== Hekatomnid dynasty ===
Hecatomnus became king of Caria, at that time part of the Persian Empire, ruling from 404 BC to 358 BC and establishing the Hekatomnid dynasty. He left three sons, Mausolus, Idrieus and Pixodarus—all of whom—in their turn, succeeded him in the sovereignty; and two daughters, Artemisia and Ada, who were married to their brothers Mausolus and Idrieus.

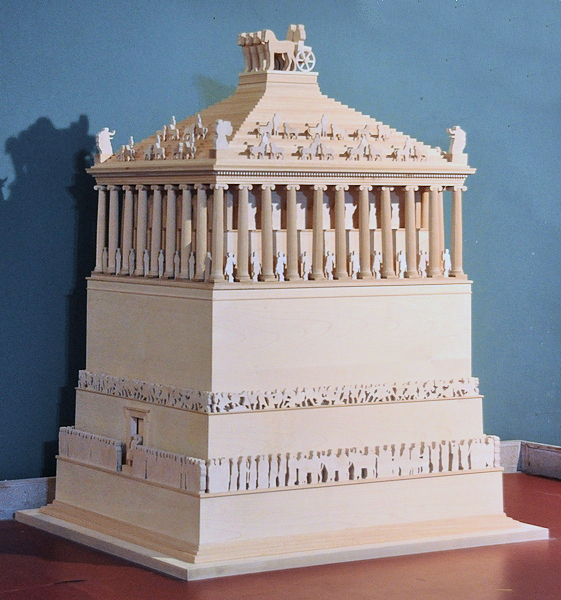
Model of the Mausoleum at Halicarnassus, at the Bodrum Museum of Underwater Archaeology.

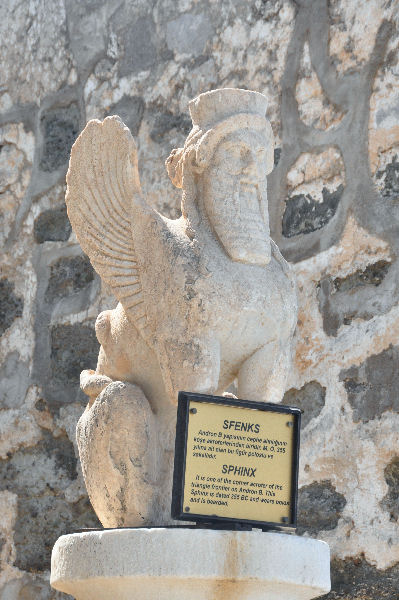
Persian sphinx from Halicarnassus, 355 BC.

Mausolus moved his capital from Mylasa to Halicarnassus. His workmen deepened the city's harbor and used the dragged sand to make protecting breakwaters in front of the channel.

On land they paved streets and squares, and built houses for ordinary citizens. And on one side of the harbor they built a massive fortified palace for Mausolus, positioned to have clear views out to sea and inland to the hills—places from where enemies could attack. On land, the workmen also built walls and watchtowers, a Greek–style theatre and a temple to Ares—the Greek god of war. Artemisia and Mausolus spent huge amounts of tax money to embellish the city. Mausolus and Artemisia had ruled over Halicarnassus and the region surrounding it for 24 years. They commissioned statues, temples and buildings of gleaming marble. When he died in 353 BC, his wife, sister and successor, Artemisia II of Caria, began construction of a magnificent tomb for him and herself on a hill overlooking the city. She died in 351 BC (of grief, according to Cicero, Tusculan Disputations 3.31). According to Pliny the Elder the craftsmen continued to work on the tomb after the death of their patron, "considering that it was at once a memorial of his own fame and of the sculptor's art," finishing it in 350 BC. This tomb of Mausolus came to be known as the Mausoleum, one of the seven wonders of the ancient world.

Artemisia was succeeded by her brother Idrieus, who, in turn, was succeeded by his wife and sister Ada when he died in 344 BC. However, Ada was usurped by her brother Pixodarus in 340 BC. On the death of Pixodarus in 335 BC his son-in-law, a Persian named Orontobates, received the satrapy of Caria from Darius III of Persia.

=== Alexander the Great and Ada of Caria ===
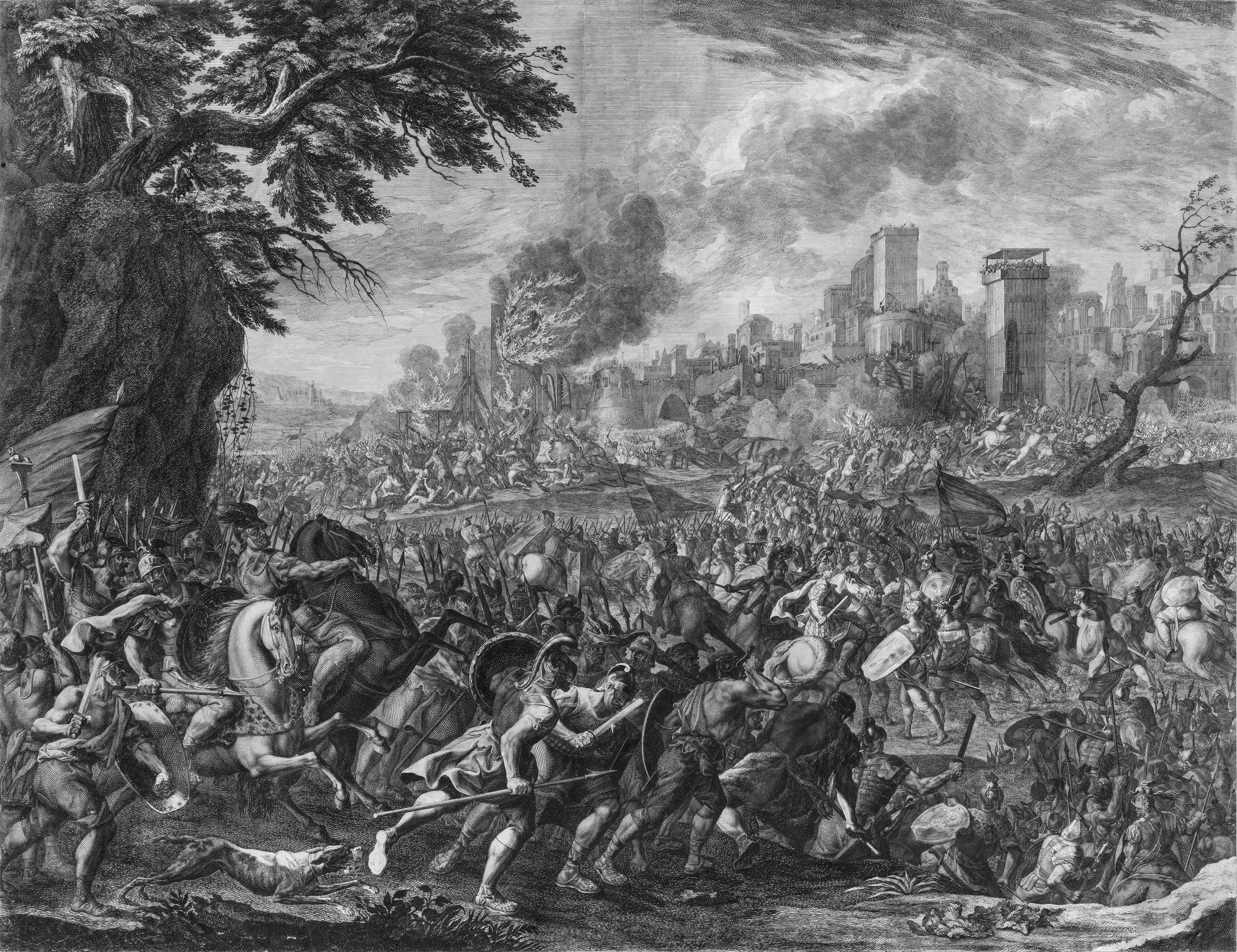
The siege and capture of Halicarnassus under Alexander the Great.

When Alexander the Great entered Caria in 334 BC, Ada, who was in possession of the fortress of Alinda, surrendered the fortress to him. After taking Halicarnassus, Alexander handed back the government of Caria to her; she, in turn, formally adopted Alexander as her son, ensuring that the rule of Caria passed unconditionally to him upon her eventual death.

During the siege of Halicarnassus the city was set ablaze by the retreating Persians who were under the command of Memnon. As he was not able to enter the citadel, Alexander was forced to leave it blockaded. The ruins of this citadel and moat are now a tourist attraction in Bodrum.

=== Later history ===
Not long afterwards the citizens received the present of a gymnasium from Ptolemy and built in his honour a stoa or portico. Under Egyptian hegemony, around 268 BC, a citizen named Hermias became Nesiarch of the Nesiotic League in the Cyclades.

Halicarnassus never recovered altogether from the disasters of the siege, and Cicero describes it as almost deserted.

Baroque artist Johann Elias Ridinger depicted the several stages of siege and taking of the place in a huge copper engraving as one of only two known today from his Alexander set. The Christian and later history of the site is continued at Bodrum.

== Archaeological notes and restorations ==
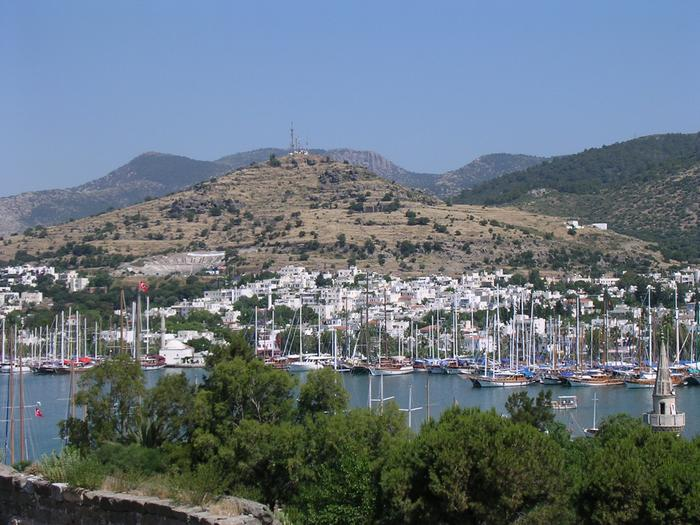
Ruins of the ancient Theater and Acropolis of Halicarnassus (modern Bodrum).

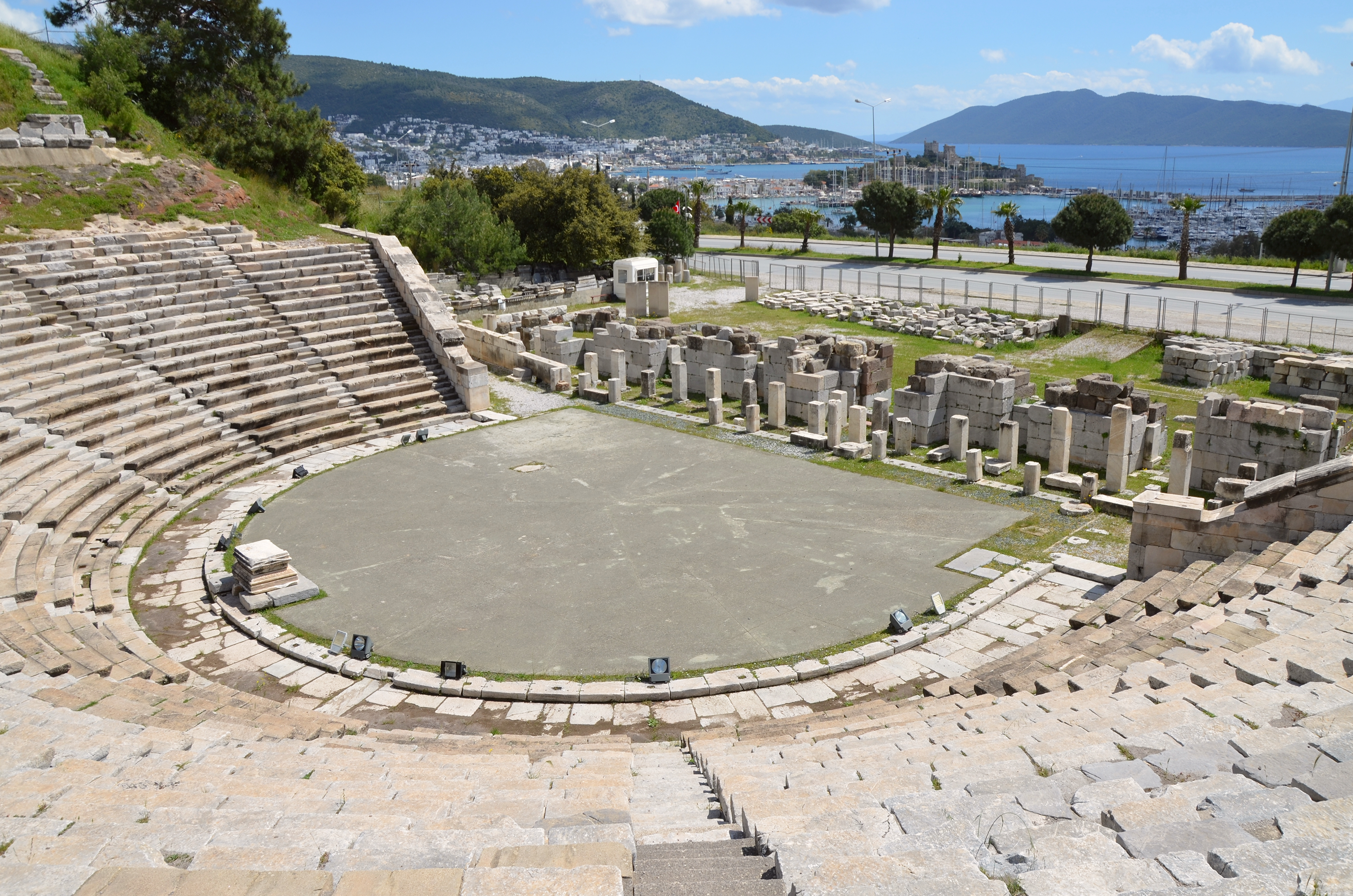
Theatre at Halicarnassus in Bodrum, with the Bodrum Castle seen in the background.

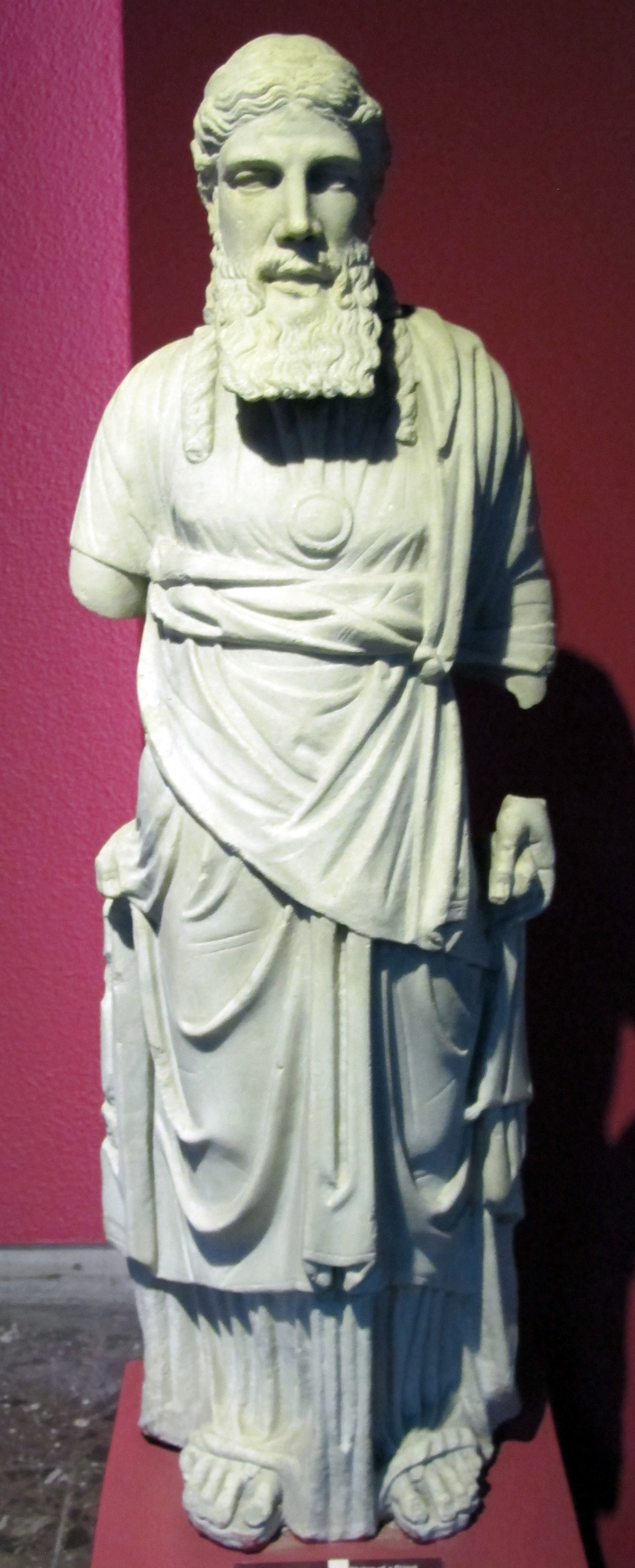
Statue of a priest from Halicarnassus (modern Bodrum).

The site is now occupied in part by the town of Bodrum; but the ancient walls can still be traced round nearly all their circuit, and the position of several of the temples, the Theatre of Halicarnassus, and other public buildings can be fixed with certainty.

The ruins of the mausoleum were recovered sufficiently by the 1857 excavations of Charles Newton to enable a fairly complete restoration of its design to be made. The building consisted of five parts—a basement or podium, a pteron or enclosure of columns, a pyramid, a pedestal and a chariot group. The basement, covering an area of 114 feet by 92, was built of blocks of greenstone, cased with marble and covered in carvings of cows. Round the base of it were probably disposed groups of statuary. The pteron consisted (according to Pliny) of thirty-six columns of the Ionic order, enclosing a square cella. Between the columns probably stood single statues. From the portions that have been recovered, it appears that the principal frieze of the pteron represented combats of Greeks and Amazons. In addition, there are also many life-size fragments of animals, horsemen, etc., belonging probably to pedimental sculptures, but formerly supposed to be parts of minor friezes. Above the pteron rose the pyramid, mounting by 24 steps to an apex or pedestal.

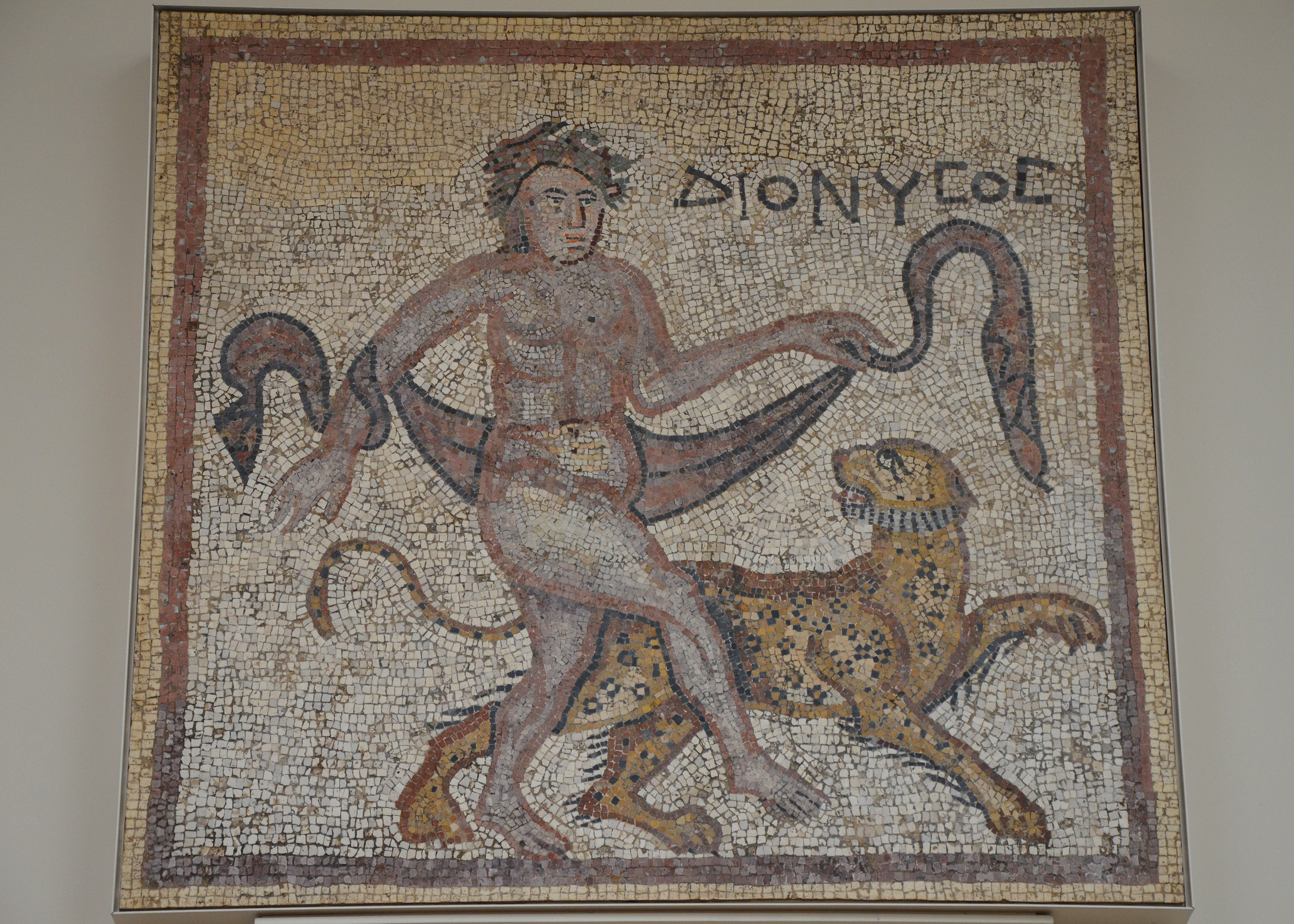
Part of a panel from a mosaic pavement from Halicarnassus (Roman Empire), British Museum (14097669977)

On this apex stood the chariot with the figure of Mausolus himself and an attendant. The height of the statue of Mausolus in the British Museum is 9'9" without the plinth. The hair falls from the forehead in thick waves on each side of the face and descends nearly to the shoulder; the beard is short and close, the face square and massive, the eyes deep set under overhanging brows. All sorts of restorations of this famous monument have been proposed. The original one, made by Newton and Pullan, is in error in many respects; and that of Oldfield, though to be preferred for its lightness (the mausoleum was said anciently to be "suspended in mid-air"). Another by veteran German architect, F. Adler was published in 1900; but studies have since been made (see below).

See also House of Charidemos.

== Notable people ==
- Agasides - Greek athlete
- Artemisia I (fl. 480 BC), Queen of Halicarnassus, who participated in the Battle of Salamis
- Herodotus (c. 484 – c. 425 BC), Greek historian
- Dionysius (c. 60 – 8 BC), historian and teacher of rhetoric
- Pigres of Halicarnassus - Greek poet
- Aelius Dionysius (fl. 2nd century), Greek rhetorician and musician
- Heraclitus of Halicarnassus - Greek Elegiac Poet
- Hegesippus of Halicarnassus - a naval commander of Antigonus Monophthalmus
- Scylax of Halicarnassus - ancient astronomer
- Cleon of Halicarnassus - ancient orator
- Phormio of Halicarnassus - ancient boxer who was a victor at the boxing in the 97 Ancient Olympic Games
- Asiaticus of Halicarnassus - ancient victor at the Stadion in the 197 Ancient Olympic Games
- Julian of Halicarnassus - bishop of Halicarnassus and a leader of the Monophysites in the 6th century

== See also ==
- List of ancient Greek cities

== Bibliography ==
- Kraege, Desmond Bryan (ed), Martin, Felix (ed), 2026, The Afterlife of the Mausoleum of Halicarnassus, Re-conceiving an Ancient Wonder in Early Modern Europe, Cambridge University Press
- Cook, B. F., Bernard Ashmole, and Donald Emrys Strong. 2005. Relief Sculpture of the Mausoleum At Halicarnassus. Oxford: Oxford University Press.
- Dinsmoor, William B. (1908). "The Mausoleum at Halicarnassus". American Journal of Archaeology. 12 (1): 3–29, 141–197. doi:10.2307/496853. JSTOR 496853. S2CID 193059202.
- F. Adler, F. (1900). "Das Mausoleum zu Halikarnass" (PDF). Zeitschrift für Bauwesen. 50: 2–19. Archived from the original (PDF) on 2012-04-02.
- Fergusson, James (1862). The Mausoleum at Halicarnassus restored in conformity with the recently discovered remains. London: J. Murry.
- Jeppeson, Kristian. 2002. The Maussolleion at Halikarnassos: Reports of the Danish archaeological expedition to Bodrum: The superstructure, a comparative analysis of the architectural, sculptural, and literary evidence. Vol. 5. Aarhus, Denmark: Aarhus Univ. Press.
- Newton, Charles Thomas; Pullan, Richard Popplewell (1862–1863). A history of discoveries at Halicarnassus, Cnidus & Branchidæ (2 Vols). London: Day and Son.. Google books: Volume 1, Volume 2.
- Oldfield, Edmund (1895). "The Mausoleum at Halicarnassus. A new restoration". Archaeologia. 54 (2): 273–362. doi:10.1017/s0261340900018051.
- Oldfield, Edmund (1897). "The Mausoleum at Halicarnassus. The probable arrangement and signification of its principal sculptures". Archaeologia. 55 (2): 343–390. doi:10.1017/s0261340900014417.
- Preedy, J. B. Knowlton (1910). "The Chariot Group of the Maussolleum". Journal of Hellenic Studies. 30: 133–162. doi:10.2307/624266. JSTOR 624266. S2CID 163616138.
- Rodríguez Moya, Inmaculada, and Víctor Mínguez. 2017. The Seven Ancient Wonders In the Early Modern World. New York: Routledge.
- Six, J. (1905). "The pediments of the Maussolleum". Journal of Hellenic Studies. 25: 1–13. doi:10.2307/624205. JSTOR 624205. S2CID 164155840.
- Steele, James, and Ersin Alok. 1992. Hellenistic Architecture In Asia Minor. London: Academy Editions.
- Stevenson, John James (1909). A restoration of the Mausoleum at Halicarnassus. London: B. T. Batsford.
- Wiater, Nicolas. 2011. The Ideology of Classicism: Language, History, and Identity In Dionysius of Halicarnassus. New York: De Gruyter.
- Winter, Frederick E. 2006. Studies In Hellenistic Architecture. Toronto: University of Toronto Press.
