= Dalaman Airport =

Airport serving Dalaman, Turkey

Dalaman Airport Dalaman Havalimanı

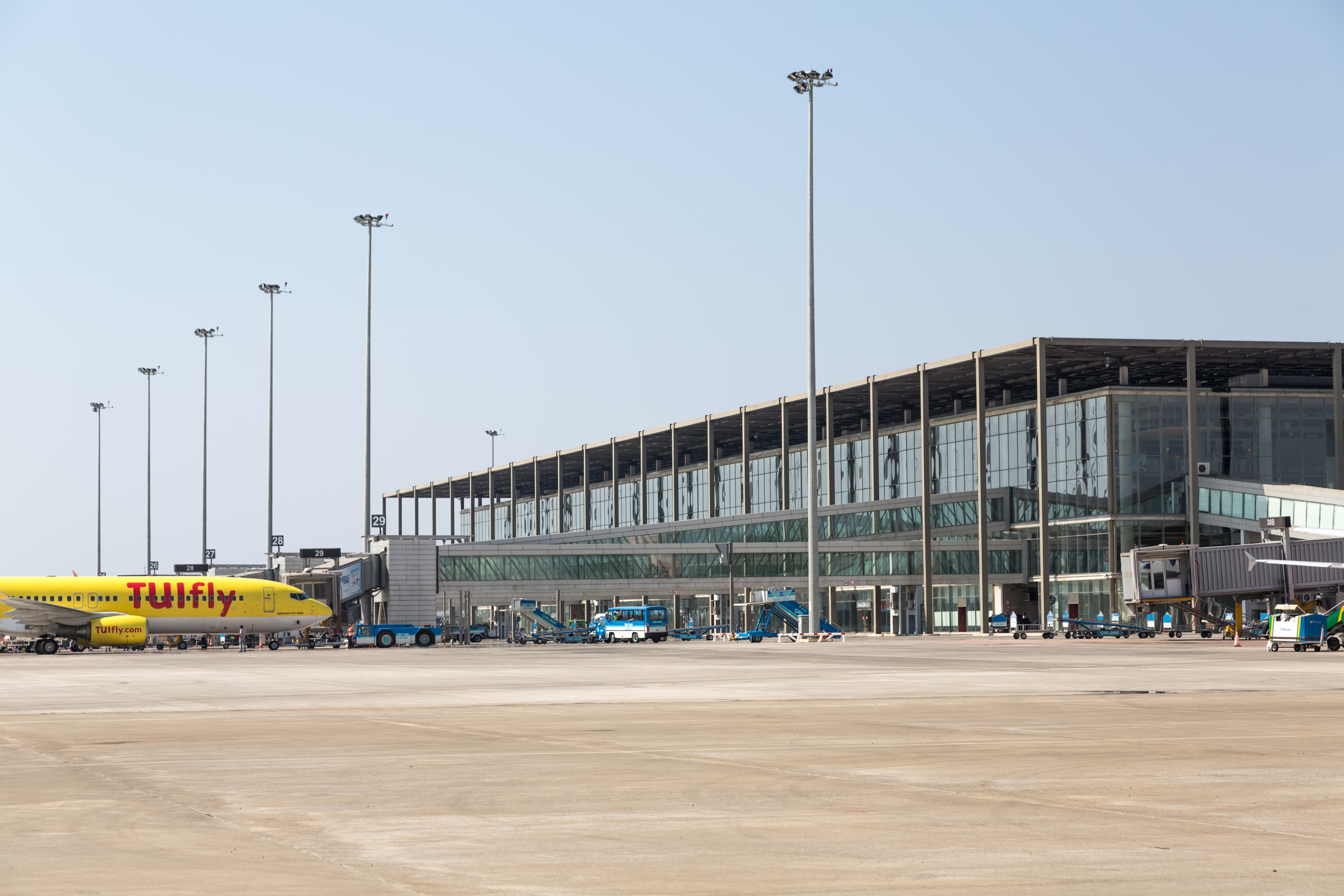
- IATA: DLM; ICAO: LTBS

Summary
- Airport type: Public / Military
- Owner: General Directorate of State Airports (DHMİ)
- Operator: YDA Airport Investment and Management, Inc
- Serves: Muğla, Turkey
- Location: Dalaman, Muğla, Turkey
- Opened: 7 August 1981; 45 years ago
- Operating base for: Pegasus Airlines
- Elevation AMSL: 20 ft (6.1 m)
- Coordinates: 36°42′53″N 28°47′34″E
- Website: www.dalamanairport.aero

Map
- Location of airport in Turkey DLM/LTBS (Europe)

Runways
Direction	Length		Surface
Direction	ft	m	Surface
01L/19R	9,842	3,000	Concrete
01R/19L

Statistics (2025)
- Annual passenger capacity: 10,000,000
- Passengers: 5,577,142
- Passenger change 2024–25: ▼1%
- Aircraft movements: 50,139
- Movements change 2024–25: ▲3%

Dalaman Airport (IATA: DLM, ICAO: LTBS) is an international airport and one of three serving southwest Turkey, the others being Milas–Bodrum Airport and Antalya Airport. It has two terminals. The old terminal is used for domestic flights and the new terminal is for international flights. The airport serves the surrounding tourist areas of Ölüdeniz, Dalyan, Fethiye, Hisarönü, Ovacık, Kaş, Kalkan, Marmaris and environs of Dalaman. Flights are available to and from over 120 destinations, across the rest of Turkey, Europe, North Africa and the Middle East, making it one of the busiest airports in the Middle East.

== History ==
The construction of Dalaman airport was begun in 1976, and it opened in 1981 as an aerodrome. In 1989, it was promoted to airport status. The airport extends over an area of 6.15 million m^{2}.

The new Dalaman International Terminal cost approximately $150,000,000 to complete. It was designed by renowned architect Emre Arolat, whose other projects include the award-winning Sancaklar Mosque. The terminal features 12 boarding gates, eight with covered airbridges. The apron was also re-designed, increasing space for remote stands. Consequently, the airport has the capacity to handle up to 35 flights at any one time. In total, the terminal now has a floor space of 95,000m^{2}, compared with less than 45,000m^{2} prior to refurbishment. Check-in and departures are based on the upper two levels, with arrivals using the lower two levels. The old terminal building is still in use and operated as the domestic terminal.

International Terminal

== Airlines and destinations ==
Airlines	Destinations
Aeroflot	Seasonal: Moscow–Sheremetyevo
Aer Lingus	Seasonal: Dublin
Air Serbia	Seasonal charter: Belgrade
AJet	Ankara, Istanbul–Sabiha Gökçen; Seasonal: Amman, Beirut, Düsseldorf (begins 24 April 2027), Frankfurt (begins 26 April 2027), Hannover (begins 24 April 2027), Munich (resumes 25 April 2027), Stuttgart (begins 23 April 2027), Vienna
Austrian Airlines	Seasonal charter: Vienna
Azerbaijan Airlines	Seasonal: Baku
Belavia	Seasonal charter: Minsk
British Airways	Seasonal: London–Gatwick, London–Heathrow
Corendon Airlines	Seasonal: Cologne/Bonn
Corendon Dutch Airlines	Seasonal: Amsterdam, Groningen
easyJet	London–Gatwick, Manchester; Seasonal: Belfast–International, Birmingham, Bristol, Edinburgh, Glasgow, Liverpool, London–Luton, London–Southend, Newcastle upon Tyne
Edelweiss Air	Seasonal: Zurich
Enter Air	Seasonal charter: Gdańsk, Katowice, Poznań, Warsaw–Chopin
European Air Charter	Seasonal charter: Sofia
Finnair	Seasonal: Helsinki
GetJet Airlines	Seasonal charter: Vilnius
Ikar	Seasonal charter: Syktyvkar
IrAero	Seasonal: Sochi
Jet2.com	Seasonal: Belfast–International, Birmingham, Bournemouth, Bristol, East Midlands, Edinburgh, Glasgow, Leeds/Bradford, Liverpool, London–Luton, London–Stansted, Manchester, Newcastle upon Tyne
LOT Polish Airlines	Seasonal charter: Warsaw–Chopin
Pegasus Airlines	Adana/Mersin, Ankara, Istanbul–Sabiha Gökçen; Seasonal: Beirut
Ryanair	Bratislava, London–Stansted; Seasonal: Dublin
Rossiya Airlines	Sochi
Scandinavian Airlines	Seasonal: Copenhagen
Smartwings	Seasonal charter: Bratislava,, Budapest, Gdansk, Katowice, Prague, Warsaw–Chopin, Wrocław
Southwind Airlines	Seasonal charter: Moscow–Sheremetyevo
SunExpress	Seasonal: Berlin, Birmingham, Brussels, Cologne/Bonn, Düsseldorf, Frankfurt, Hamburg, London–Gatwick, Manchester, Munich, Newcastle upon Tyne, Nuremberg Stuttgart, Vienna, Zurich
Transavia	Seasonal: Amsterdam
TUI Airways	Seasonal: Aberdeen, Belfast–International, Birmingham, Bournemouth, Bristol, Cardiff, East Midlands, Exeter, Glasgow, London–Gatwick, Manchester, Newcastle upon Tyne, Norwich
TUI fly Belgium	Seasonal: Brussels
TUI fly Deutschland	Seasonal: Düsseldorf, Frankfurt, Hannover, Munich, Stuttgart
TUI fly Netherlands	Seasonal: Amsterdam
Turkish Airlines	Istanbul; Seasonal charter: Moscow-Vnukovo, Saint Petersburg
Wizz Air	Seasonal: London–Gatwick

== Statistics ==
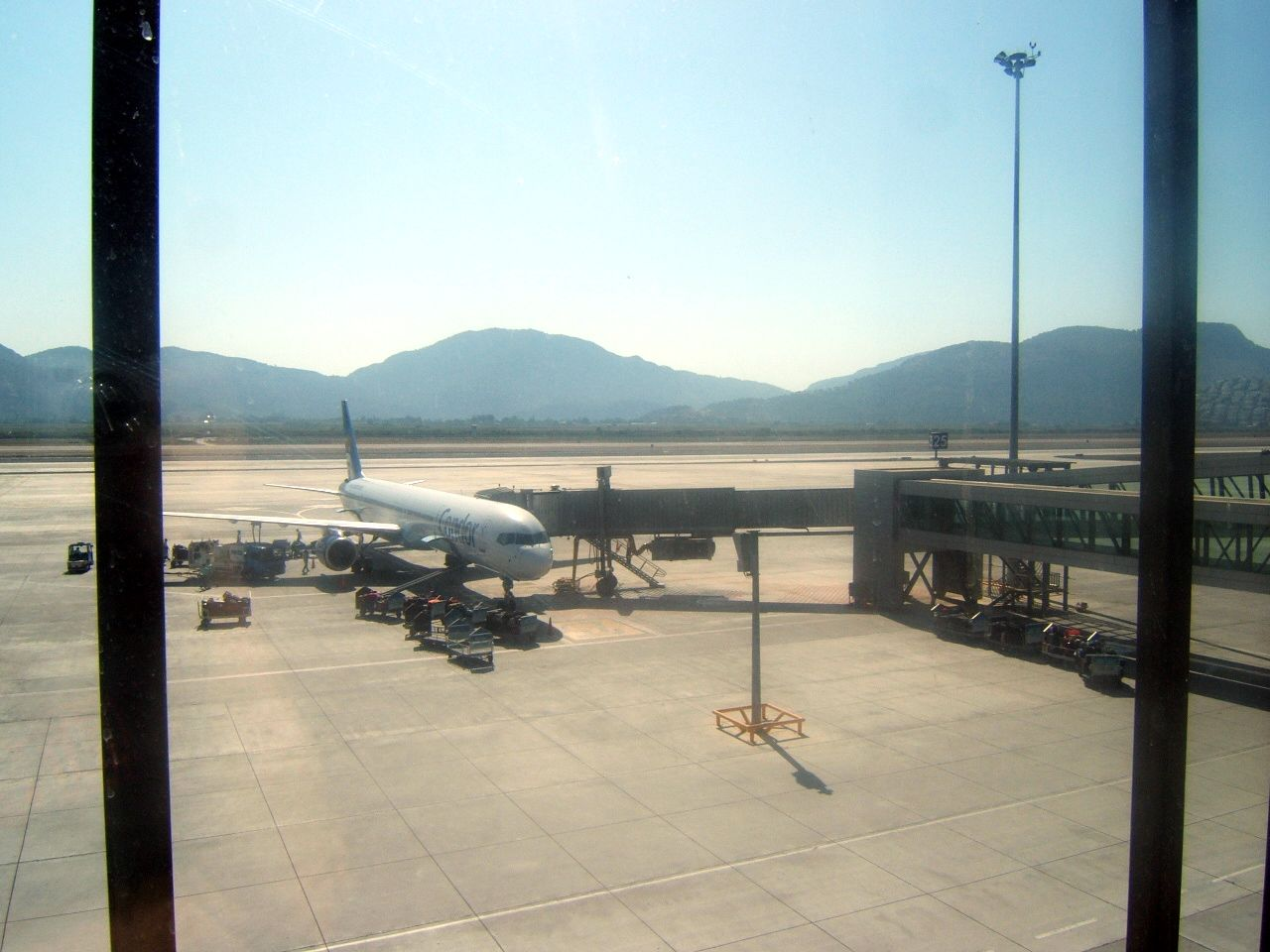
A Condor Boeing 757-300 on the apron

Dalaman Airport passenger traffic statistics
Year	Domestic	% change	International	% change	Total	% change
2025	1,949,913	▲5%	3,627,229	▼4%	5,577,142	▼1%
2024	1,865,929	▲5%	3,771,138	▲9%	5,637,067	▲8%
2023	1,770,075	▲16%	3,465,483	▲15%	5,235,558	▲15%
2022	1,520,015	▲9%	3,015,585	▲224%	4,535,600	▲95%
2021	1,393,116	▲84%	930,758	▲12%	2,323,874	▲46%
2020	756,473	▼52%	830,652	▼75%	1,587,125	▼68%
2019	1,583,089	▼2%	3,321,930	▲13%	4,905,019	▲8%
2018	1,615,590	▲11%	2,935,900	▲30%	4,559,246	▲22%
2017	1,461,033	▲14%	2,257,735	▲24%	3,718,768	▲20%
2016	1,279,611	▲4%	1,822,291	▼42%	3,101,902	▼29%
2015	1,235,222	▲22%	3,141,879	▼5%	4,377,101	▲2%
2014	980,926	▲15%	3,295,748	▲3%	4,276,674	▲5%
2013	851,704	▲3%	3,203,926	▲7%	4,055,630	▲6%
2012	823,508	▲18%	2,986,507	▼2%	3,810,015	▲2%
2011	692,090	▲15%	3,040,851	▼5%	3,732,941	▼1%
2010	592,321	▲27%	3,192,119	▲11%	3,784,440	▲13%
2009	464,729	▲6%	2,883,267	▲4%	3,347,996	▲4%
2008	437,174	▲10%	2,771,494	▲11%	3,208,668	▲11%
2007	398,814	▲11%	2,497,153	▲6%	2,895,967	▲7%
2006	359,663	▲25%	2,348,319	▼19%	2,707,982	▼15%
2005	288,548	▲52%	2,882,680	▲13%	3,171,228	▲15%
2004	189,977	▲14%	2,557,577	▲22%	2,747,454	▲22%
2003	166,072	▼9%	2,089,002	▼5%	2,255,074	▼5%
2002	182,455	▲8%	2,191,846	▲11%	2,374,301	▲11%
2001	168,472	▼38%	1,978,749	▲26%	2,147,221	▲17%
2000	272,941	Steady	1,566,761	Steady	1,839,702	Steady

== Ground transport ==
Shuttle services are available to Marmaris or Fethiye and Menteşe (central district of Muğla) along Marmaris and Fethiye. These services from the airport are mostly dependent on the arrival of domestic flights. Passengers from foreign flights generally use transfers or taxis. Parking facilities are available for up to 550 vehicles outside the terminal building.
