= Meydan (park) =

Urban public park

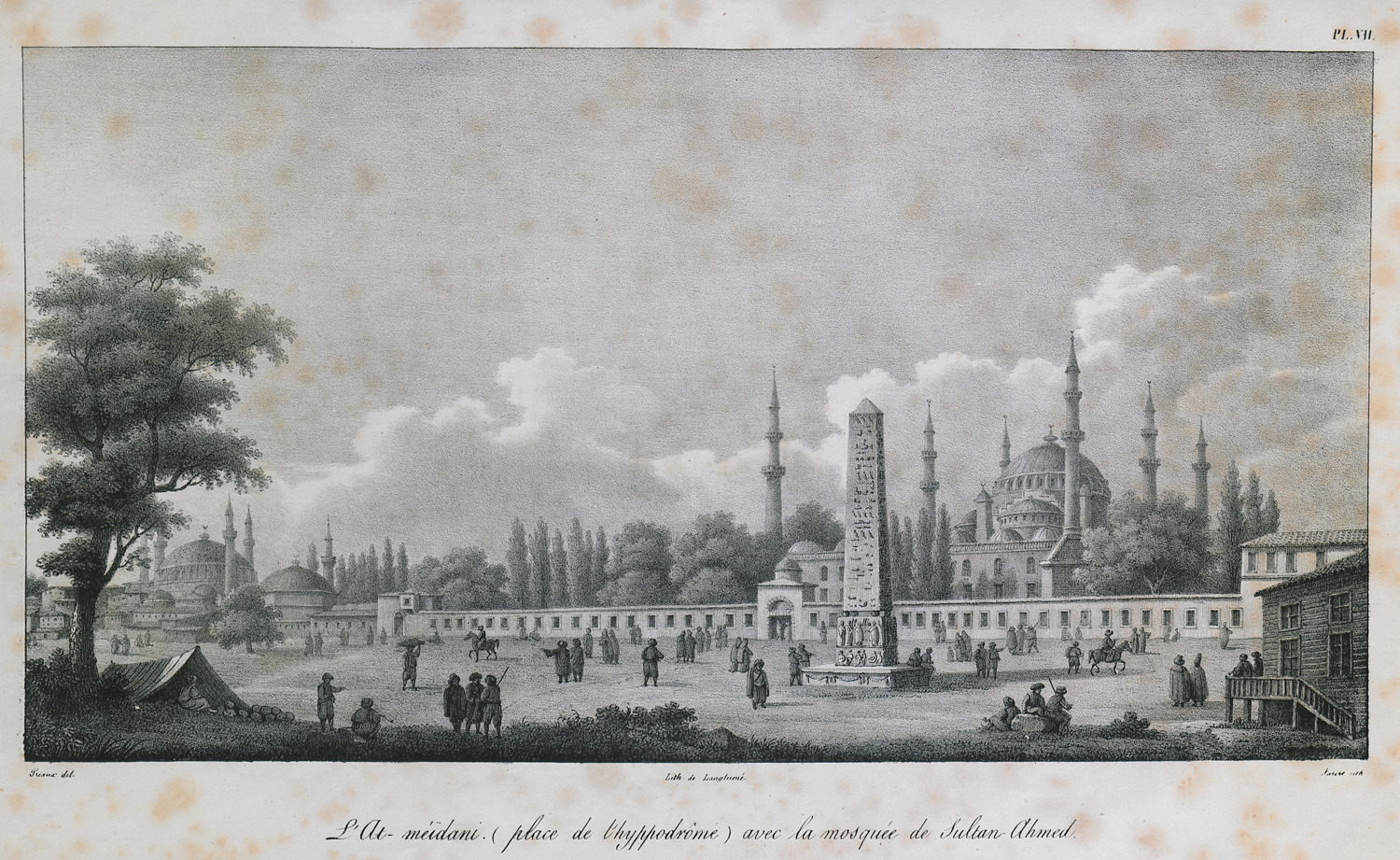
"Meidan, Constantinople" - Andreossy Antoine-François Comte - 1828

The meydan is an urban public park or open space. The word is often associated with the Ottoman Empire, and refers to a public area in which discussions take place and speeches are made. The word and concept is current in the Republic of Turkey.

A good example of a meydan can be seen in Ohrid, North Macedonia. On two sides of the meydan in Ohrid, there are two mosques. In the centre of the meydan there is a çinar (plane tree) to shade one from the heat. There are places to sit and there is water to drink. One can deduce from the historical existence of the water source, the reason for existence of both the çinar and the meydan.

The çinar is said to be 900 years old. From this we may deduce that the meydan already existed at least 500 years before the arrival of the Ottomans.

There is an interesting literary insight into the function of the meydan in Birds Without Wings by Englishman, Louis de Bernières. Being a public space, people were consulted there, were executed there. This was the space where the people needed to go to learn of the rulings of the authorities.

Similar public open spaces can be found in the Christian world, with similar functionality.
