= Kayaköy =

Ghost town in Muğla Province, Turkey

Kayaköy Λειβίσσι
- Neighbourhood
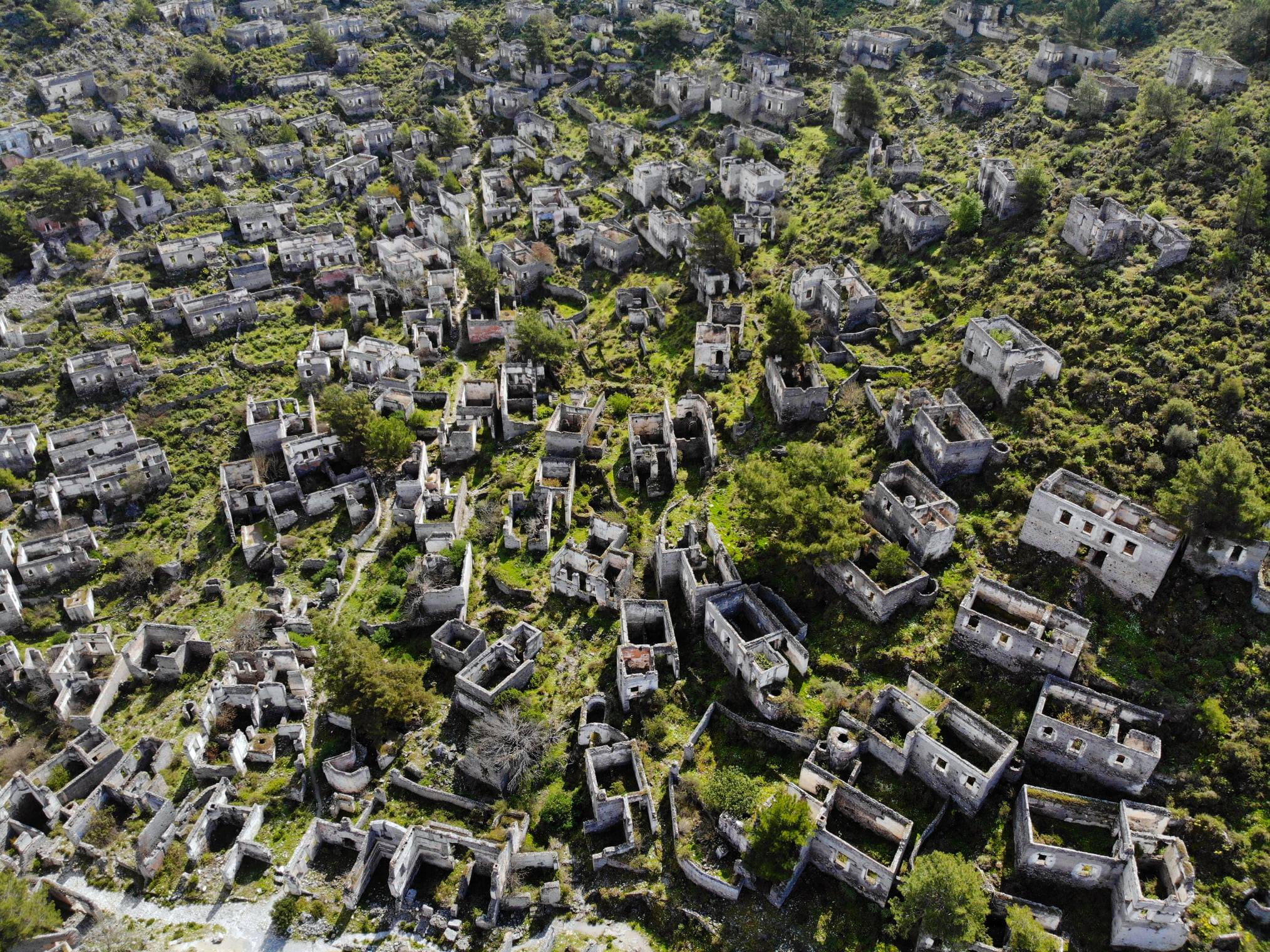
- Abandoned houses at Kayaköy

- Location within Turkey Location within Turkey Aegean
- Coordinates: 36°34′30″N 29°5′28″E
- Country: Turkey
- Province: Muğla
- District: Fethiye
- Population (2022): 975
- Time zone: UTC+3 (TRT)

Kayaköy (also: Kaya or Livissi) is a neighbourhood of the municipality and district of Fethiye, Muğla Province, Turkey. In 2022, its population was 975. Situated 8 kilometres (5.0 mi) south of Fethiye, it is mostly abandoned. It was anciently known in Greek as Karmylessos (Ancient Greek: Καρμυλησσός), shortened to Lebessos (Ancient Greek: Λεβέσσος) and pronounced in Modern Greek as Leivissi (Greek: Λειβίσσι). From Ancient Greek the town name shifted to Koine Greek by the Roman period, evolved into Byzantine Greek in the Middle Ages, and finally became the Modern Greek name still used by its townspeople before their final evacuation in 1923.

In late antiquity the inhabitants of the region had become Christian and, following the East-West Schism with the Church of Rome in 1054 AD, they came to be called Greek Orthodox Christian. These Greek-speaking Christian subjects, and their Turkish-speaking Muslim Ottoman rulers, lived in relative harmony from the end of the turbulent Ottoman conquest of the region in the 14th century until the early 20th century. Following the Greco-Turkish War of 1919–1922, and the subsequent Treaty of Lausanne in 1923, the town's Greek Orthodox residents were exiled from Livissi.

The massacres of Greeks and other Christian minorities in the Ottoman Empire during World War I (1914–1918) led to the almost total depopulation of the town's 6,500 Greek inhabitants by 1918. These former inhabitants were deprived of their properties and became refugees in Greece, or they died in Ottoman forced labour battalions (cf. Number 31328, an autobiography by a Greek-speaking novelist from a similar coastal town in Turkey).

Following these events the Allied victors in World War I authorized the occupation of Smyrna, which still had many Greek inhabitants, by Greece in May 1919. This led to the Greco-Turkish War of 1919–1922, the subsequent defeat of Greece, and the Treaty of Lausanne in 1923. That treaty contained a protocol, the population exchange between Greece and Turkey, which barred Greek refugees from returning to their prior homes in Turkey (including the previous Livissi refugees) and requiring that most of the remaining Orthodox Christians still living in Turkey emigrate to Greece. (Note: One notable exception included Greeks living in Istanbul and the Aegean Islands of Imbros and Tenedos.)

The treaty also required most of Greece's Muslim population to permanently leave Greece for Turkey (with an exception for Muslims living in Greek Thrace). Most of these Turks/Muslims from Greece were used by the Turkish state to settle its now empty Greek Christian towns, but Turks/Muslims from Greece did not wish to settle in Livissi due to rumors of ghosts of the Greeks killed there.

The ghost town, now preserved as a museum village, consists of hundreds of rundown but still mostly standing Greek-style houses and churches which cover a small mountainside and serve as a stopping place for tourists visiting Fethiye and nearby Ölüdeniz.

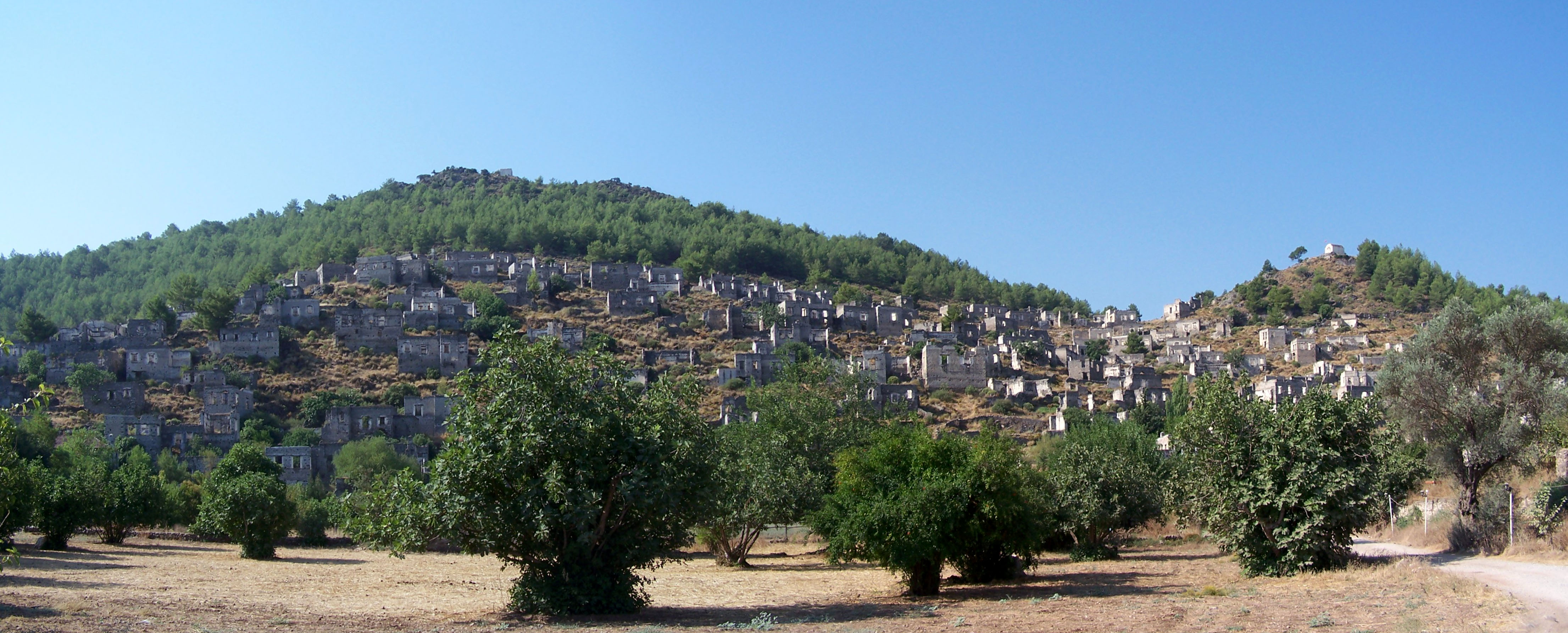
Livissi/Kayaköy village

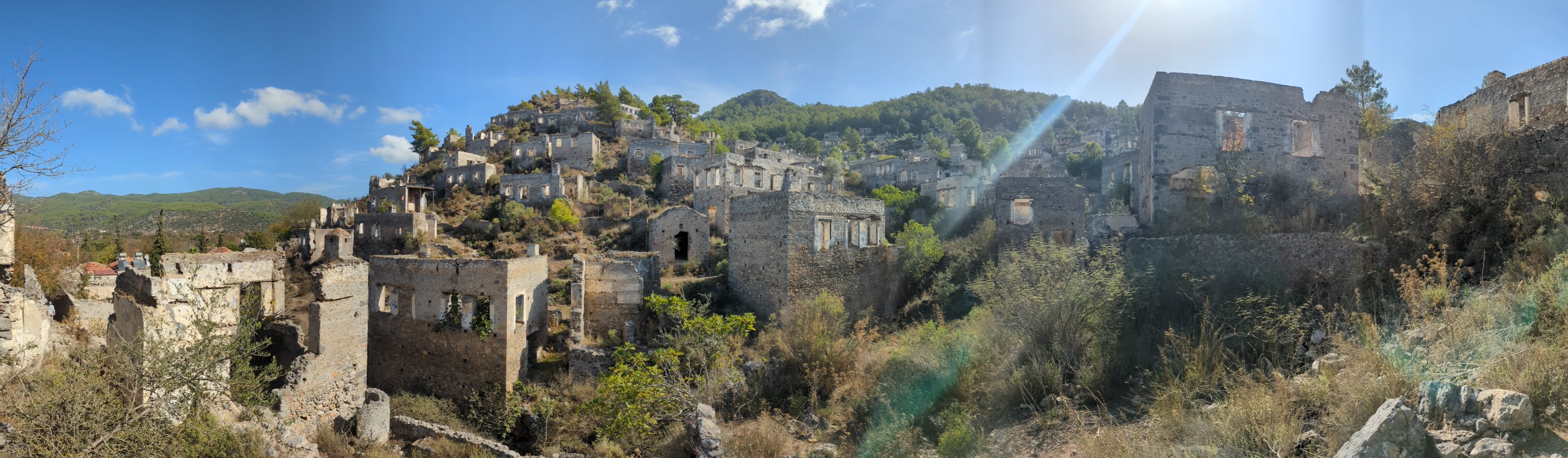
A panoramic view of a hillside neighbourhood in Kayaköy

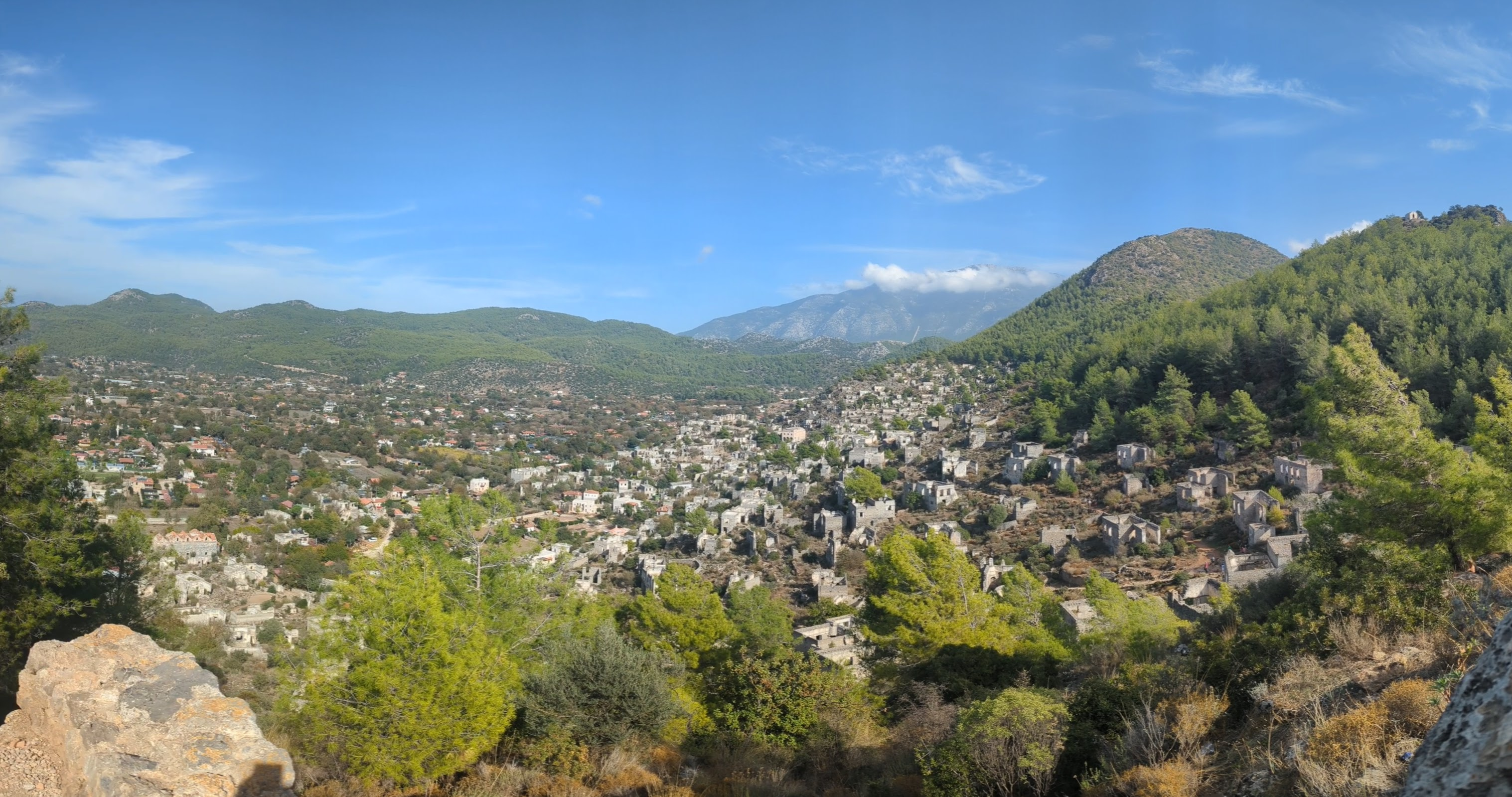
A panoramic view of Kayaköy/Leivissi from the High Chapel

The village is now empty except for tour groups and roadside vendors selling handmade goods. There are a few houses which have been restored and are currently occupied.

== History ==
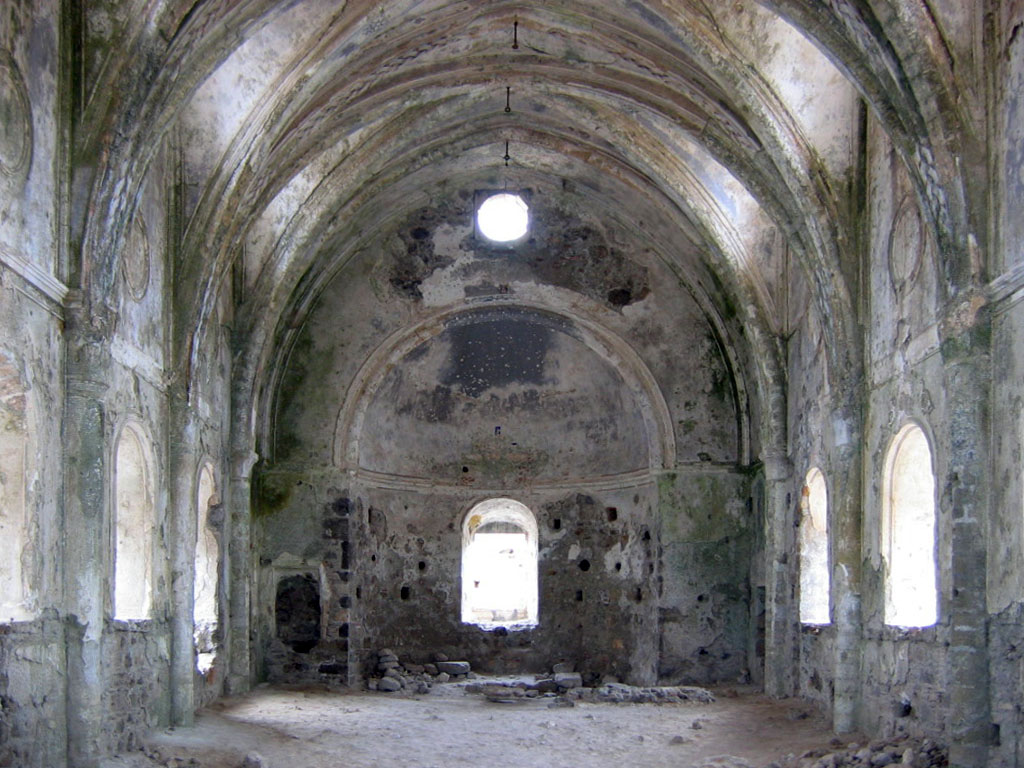
An abandoned church

Much of what remains of Livissi was built in the 18th century. Lycian style tombs can be found in the village and at Gokceburun north of the village.

Lebessus is mentioned as a Christian bishopric in the Notitia Episcopatuum of Pseudo-Epiphanius composed under the Byzantine Emperor Heraclius in about 640, and in the similar early 10th-century document attributed to Emperor Leo VI the Wise, as a suffragan of the metropolitan see of Myra, the capital of the Roman province of Lycia, to which Lebessus belonged. Since it is no longer a residential bishopric, Lebessus is listed by the Catholic Church as a titular see.

Livissi is probably the place where the inhabitants of Byzantine Gemiler Island fled to protect themselves from pirates. It experienced a renewal after nearby Fethiye (known as Makri) was devastated by an earthquake in 1856 and a major fire in 1885. More than 20 churches and chapels were built in the village and the plain (Taxiarhes – the 'Upper' church – and 'Panayia Pyrgiotissa' – the 'lower' church – St. Anna, St. George, etc.). Most of them are still standing in ruinous or semi-ruinous condition. The village population was over 6,000 people, according to Greek and Ottoman sources.

The persecutions of Livissi inhabitants as well as Greeks of nearby Makri (Fethiye) were part of the wider campaign against all Ottoman Greeks and other Christians of the Empire (cf. Armenian genocide). The persecutions in the area started in 1914 in Makri. In 1916, a letter in Greek addressed to Sir Alfred Biliotti, the Consul General of Great Britain at Rhodes, explained the murders and persecution of Livissi and Macri Greeks who asked him for intervention. Unfortunately, the letter was intercepted at Livissi by Turkish authorities. Later that same year, many families of Livissi were deported and driven on foot to Denizli, around 220 km away. There, they suffered various extreme atrocities and tortures, facing even death. According to local tradition, Muslims refused to repopulate the place because it was "infested with the ghosts of Livisians massacred in 1915".

Two more exile phases followed in 1917 and 1918. In 1917, families were sent in villages near Denizli, such as Acıpayam, through forced march of fifteen days, consisting mainly of the elderly, women and children, who had remained in the area. During that death march, the roads were strewn with bodies of dead children and the elderly who succumbed to hunger and fatigue. The exiles of the next year were no less harsh.

At the start of the Greco-Turkish War (1919–1922) Kayaköy was already nearly empty of its former inhabitants. When this war ended in September 1922, the few remaining Greeks of Livissi and Makri were forced to abandon their homes and embark on ships to Greece. Some of them founded the refugee settlement of Nea Makri (New Makri) outside of Athens.

Many of the town's empty buildings were damaged in the 1957 Fethiye earthquake.

== Kayaköy today ==
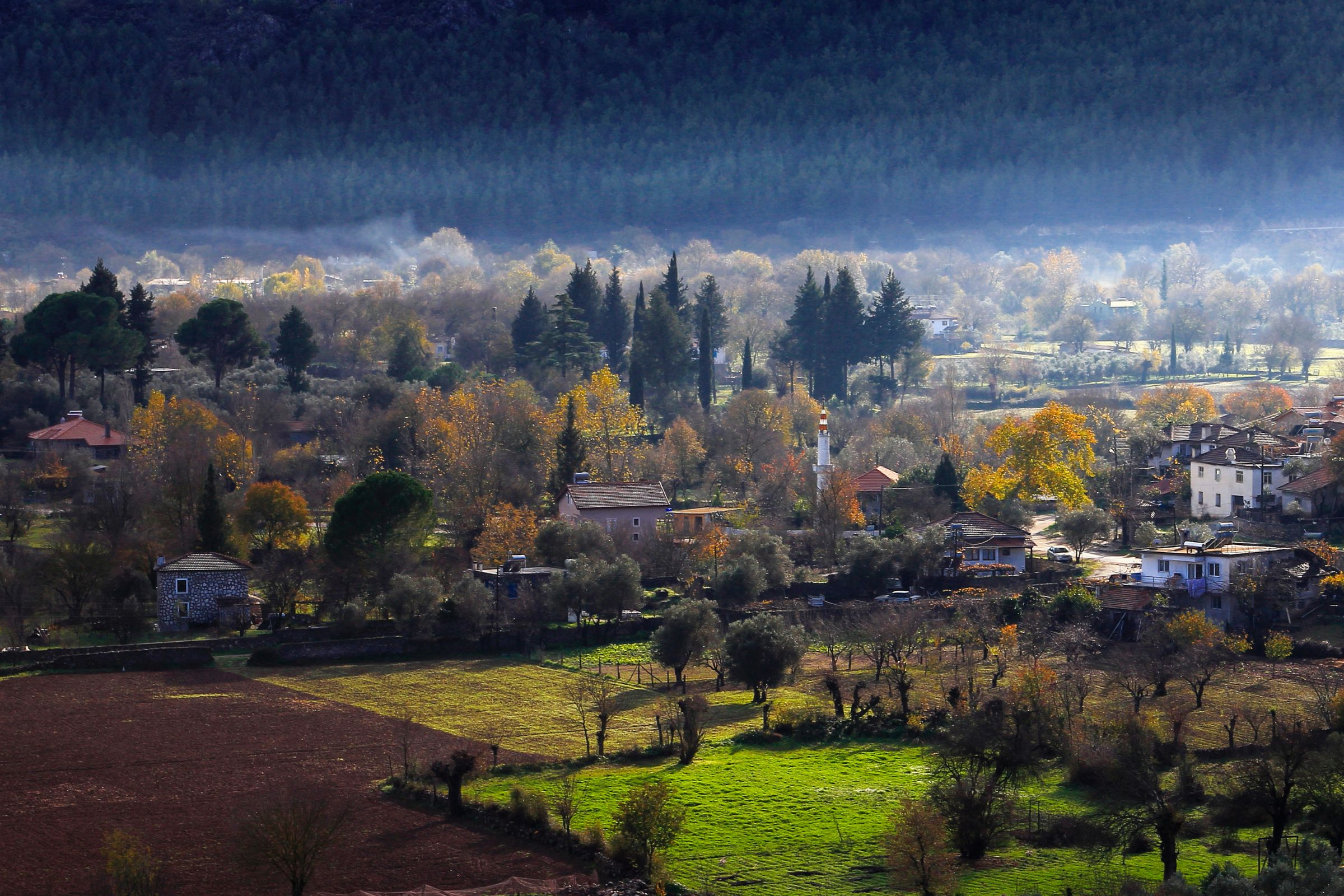
Winter time in Kayakoy

Today Kayaköy village serves as a museum and is a historical monument. Around 500 houses remain as ruins and are under the protection of the Turkish government, including two Greek Orthodox Churches, which remain the most important sites of the ghost town. There is a private museum on the history of the town. In the middle of the village stands a fountain that dates from the seventeenth century.

Some sources claim that Kayaköy was adopted by UNESCO as a World Friendship and Peace Village. However this is officially untrue, and was most likely a rumor put out by a local tourist council.

On 9 September 2014, the Turkish government announced plans to develop the village. It plans to offer a 49-year lease that will "partially open Kayaköy's archeological site to construction" and anticipated "construction of a hotel, as well as tourist facilities that will encompass one-third of the village."

As of 2026, the ghost town is a tourist attraction; there is a three-euro fee to enter the village and see the abandoned houses and churches.

== Economy ==
Villagers were mostly professional craftsmen. Currently the most important economic factor of the place is tourism. It is envisaged that the village will be partially restored.

== In popular culture ==
Kayaköy, the fictional Eskibahçe

Kayaköy is presumed to be the inspiration behind "Eskibahçe", the imaginary village chosen by Louis de Bernières as the setting of his 2004 novel Birds Without Wings.

In 2014, Kayaköy also took centre stage in the closing scenes of Russell Crowe's film The Water Diviner.

In Clive Cussler's novel The Navigator, the characters Kurt Austin and Carina Mechadi meet with a sculptor from Kayaköy, who says that he makes figurines that are based on a statue from a Lycian tomb on the Turkish Riviera.

== See also ==
- Persecution of Christians
- Persecution of Muslims during Ottoman contraction
