= Hisarönü =

- Resort
- Hisarönü
- Nickname: The Mountain Town
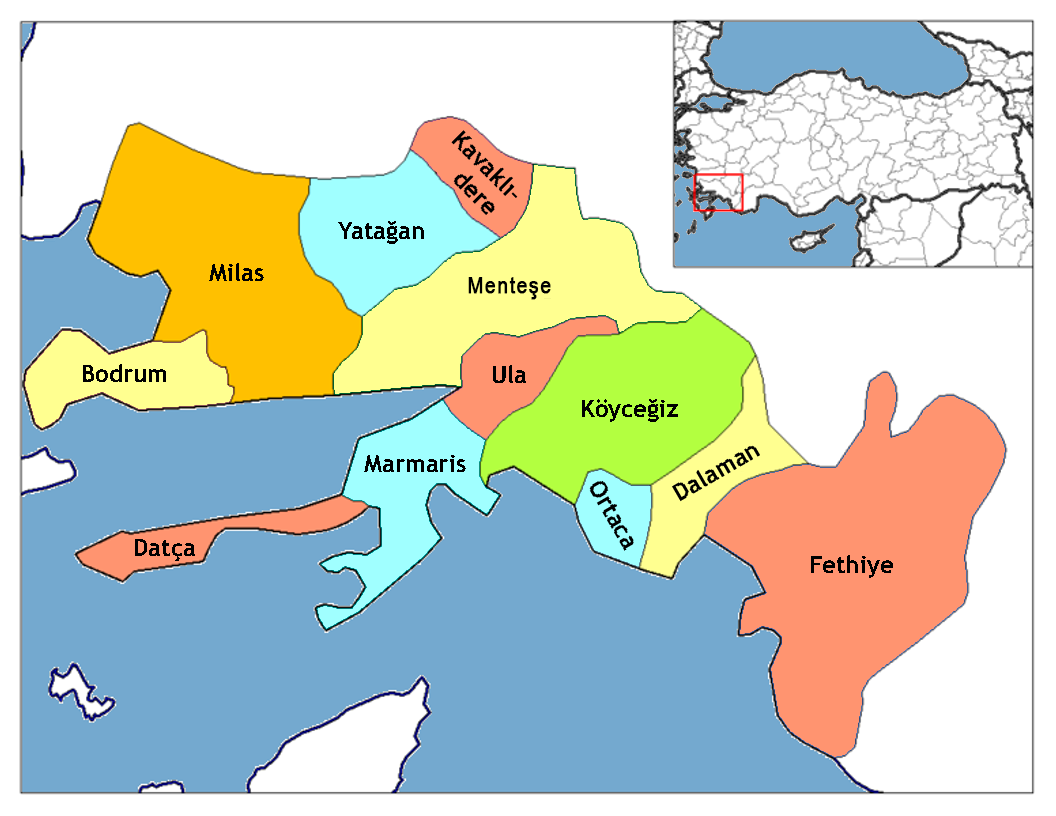
- Location of Hisarönü within Turkey.
- Coordinates: 36.5715°N 29.1428°E
- Country: Turkey
- Region: Aegean
- Province: Muğla

Population
  - Total: 3,613
- Time zone: UTC+3 (TRT)
- Postal code: 48x xx
- Area code: 0252
- Licence plate: 48

Hisarönü is a tourist resort in the Fethiye district of the Muğla Province of Turkey. It is part of the neighbourhood Ölüdeniz. It is situated at the western extreme of the Mediterranean coast of Turkey and the southern extreme of the Aegean coast. The resort has grown from a very basic village in 1990 to the large resort with its neighbor Ovacık since then. In 1992, the road through Hisaronu to Kayaköy was paved for the first time.

Hisarönü was originally intended to provide accommodation for nearby Ölüdeniz (where new building work is quite restricted), but has now become a holiday resort in its own right and is popular with British holidaymakers in particular.

The closest airport to the resort is Dalaman Airport.
