= Rob Ryan (artist) =

British visual artist (born 1962)

- Born: 1962 (age 63–64); Paphos, Cyprus
- Education: Trent Polytechnic, Royal College of Art
- Occupation: Artist
- Known for: illustrations, papercutting, screenprinting

Rob Ryan (born 1962) is a British visual artist who specialises in papercutting and screen-printing. He is known for his detailed paper cut outs. His artwork has featured in Vogue, Elle, and Stylist. He has also collaborated with fashion designer Paul Smith. Ryan was elected Master of the Art Workers' Guild for 2024.

Ryan has illustrated book and album covers, including John Connolly's novel The Book of Lost Things, Erasure's album Nightbird, Louis de Bernières short-story collection Notwithstanding and Dara Horn's novel The World to Come. His first book, This Is for You, was published in October 2007 by Hodder & Stoughton; it consists of a fairy tale told through his paper cut-out art and explores themes of love and loneliness. Ryan also creates the Global Gift greeting cards for the charity Trocaire.

== Education ==
Ryan studied at Trent Polytechnic and has a Master of Arts in printmaking from the Royal College of Art. He graduated from the Royal College of Art in 1987.

== Personal life ==
Ryan was born in 1962 in Cyprus in Paphos to Irish parents Doris and Buddy Ryan who divorced in 1966. He is the youngest of three brothers and his father was an RAF mess hall officer.

He currently works from his studio in London, where he lives with his wife and two daughters.
