= Labels and Other Stories =

2019 short story collection

- First edition
- Author: Louis de Bernières
- Cover artist: Georgie McAusland
- Language: English
- Publisher: Harvill Secker
- Publication date: 11 April 2019
- Publication place: United Kingdom
- Media type: Print
- Pages: 208
- ISBN: 1-91-121564-7

Labels and Other Stories is a 2019 collection of fourteen short stories by author Louis de Bernières set in both South America and Europe. It was published in the UK by Harvill Secker. De Bernières is best known for his prize-winning fourth novel Captain Corelli's Mandolin.

== Stories ==
- Labels (first published by One Horse Press, 1993) - The narrator in need of a hobby, starts collecting the labels from catfood tins. He becomes obsessed, his wife leaves him and he starts travelling overseas to collect European catfood labels. He then loses his job and starts eating the contents of the tins. Realising that with a bit of flavouring and garnishing they can become a tasty pâté. He then supplies his meals to a local delicatessen, and successfully to higher-end restaurants. His wife returns and together they make a success of the business.
- Günter Weber's Confession (first published by Tartarus Press, 1998) - Completed after Captain Corelli's Mandolin de Bernières wrote a final chapter to the novel. Leutnant Günter Weber returns to the house of Pelagia and Dr Iannis in the Greek island of Cephalonia after the massacre of the Italian soldiers, confessing his guilt of his actions.
- The Turks Are so Wonderful with Children (first published in Sport 23, Spring 1999) - Robert and Susan Freeman met at University, had a holiday in Turkey, married and had a son Vinnie. But he was a difficult child and found they could not cope with his behaviour. They found that the Turkish people were kind to both animals and children so decided to leave Vinnie in Turkey...
- Stupid Gringo (first published in the Journal of the Short Story in English, Autumn 1997) - Jean-Louis Langevin had been told to set up an office in Bogotá in Colombia and had been warned about all the criminality in the city. So he put his money in his sock and left his wedding ring in the hotel safe. After a while he found the place to be rather cosmopolitan, but then one day he felt footsteps behind him and started to panic and tried to escape his follower...
- Romance on the Underground - The narrator warns a 14-year-old youth that 'all through your life you will be perplexed by women'. The man tells of his experience of them, particularly when he falls in love with a woman on the underground.
- Mamacita's Treasure - Mamacita was an elderly midwife who one day dreamt of treasure. She sold a map of the treasure's location for 3000 pesos to Don Agostini, who she helped to deliver him as a baby. Don Agostini searched for the treasure but could not find it. Meanwhile, Mamacita hid the money given to her for the map. When she died she had a rough map of its location, but it also could not be found.
- Our Lady of Beauty (first published in The Paris Review, Issue 148 - Fall 1998) - A village graveyard is sited on the slope of a volcano, the dead are upright, entombed above the ground. Many of the tombs are broken and bodies can be seen inside. Many stories of the dead are revered, including the eruption of the volcano where many bodies were tossed from their tombs.
- The Complete Continent - Father Alfonsin believed that it was a wife's duty to have children at their husband's whim. Peru's mother was married at 14 and his father was determined that all their children were to be named after all the countries in Latin America, from Colombia to Suriname.
- The Two Dolphins - Amadea tastes the soil and wants a suitor to find the perfect soil, eventually she finds it in a dolphin transformed into a man, and they have a daughter, Venu. Meanwhile, Aurelio falls in love with dolphin which conceives his son, Rebu. Venu and Rebu meet and die in ecstasy with each other.
- The Man Who Sent Two Dead Fish - Joao lived in a wooden shack on stilts above a river where his wife had died. He had a dream that two tyrants had fallen, which would change the world's history. Two fish were washed up that morning and he smoked them and decided to send them to the president of America, to validate his dream...
- The Deposit - A violinist was addicted to heroin so he skipped town to escape his dealer. His only possession was his precious violin which he exchanged for £50 for a deposit from a music shop. He later injected drugs for his last score. Twenty-one years later he returned to the shop where he got his violin back.
- Andouil and Andouillette Begin Their Holiday - René Andouil's wife is nicknamed 'Andouillette' and he calls her 'my sausage'. They set off on holiday to Chisseaux with a caravan in tow, he has misgivings but allows his wife to sleep in it. They stop in a layby and Andouil relieves himself along a lane over a bridge and into a ditch. Andouillette wakes up and also feels the need and heads off behind a tree. René returns to the car and departs, thinking his wife is asleep. Meanwhile, four aged Hells Angels arrive at the layby and come across ditraught Andouilette...
- A Day Out for Mehmet Erbil (first published by New Writing, Volume 8, 1999) - In Turkey, Mehmet set off to Kilitbahir Castle to collect cans to increase his meagre salary. A foreigner gave him a lift to the castle but he knew only words gleaned from a phrase-book. They spent the day at the castle managing not to understand much about each other.
- A Night Off for Prudente de Moraes (published by Hay Festival Press, 2004) - In Rio de Janeiro Prudente was enjoying the evening on the beach, he walked into the city where thief held a gun to his side, planning to rob him. Prudente called the thief's bluff, doubting the gun held any bullets. Prudente told the robber that he would share a meal with him at a restaurant. But Prudente had more sinister plans...

== Reception ==
- In the Financial Times, William Skidelsky's reaction was mixed, "This makes a short-story collection by him an interesting proposition: how will he squish his maximalist tendencies into the constricted dimensions of the form? To judge from the stories in this volume, de Bernières’s approach is to lighten his palette: to abandon the more sombre themes with which his novels engage (violence, war, political turmoil), and to foreground comedy and whimsy. These stories often read like fairy tales for adults, and seem intended, above all, to raise a smile. And at their best, they do this very nicely...Several other stories in the collection follow the same basic trajectory of misfortune, reversal and final uplift — although the results, elsewhere, are not always so successful."
- Rachel Au-Yong in The Straits Times, writes "brief though it may be, this second volume of short stories by British writer Louis de Bernières takes readers on some fantastical journeys - both physical and emotional. Whether his stories are set in the streets of Brazil or among rural Turkish ruins, de Bernières - who once declared he has never written about a place he has not been to - shows off his keen eye for detail with trademark whimsy. Besides his ability to set a scene, the prolific author also creates wonderfully flawed characters, who hold up a mirror to our own failings but are written about in such comedic fashion that one's first instinct is to laugh out loud... But there are more gems than duds. De Bernières crafts whimsical stories each less than 15 pages long, but the characters in them are all larger than life. While the tales border on the fantastical, the people who populate them are recognisable. Our prejudices, our obsessions, our desire to be free - these are part of the human condition. His stories make these flaws palatable and leave us food for thought.
