= Birds Without Wings =

Novel by Louis de Bernières

- First edition
- Author: Louis de Bernières
- Language: English
- Genre: Historical, Romance, War
- Publisher: Secker and Warburg
- Publication date: 2004
- Publication place: United Kingdom
- Media type: Print
- ISBN: 1400079322

Birds Without Wings is a novel by Louis de Bernières, written in 2004. Narrated by various characters and set in the early 20th century in the fictional village of Eskibahçe in southwestern Anatolia, the novel portrays a small, mixed community whose inhabitants are primarily Christian Greeks and Muslim Turks. The villagers speak and sometimes write, combinations of Turkish and Greek, reflecting the region’s linguistic and cultural diversity. Against the backdrop of the decline of the Ottoman Empire, the First World War, and the Greco-Turkish War, the novel examines the effects of nationalism, war, and political change on individuals and communities that had previously lived together with relative harmony. The novel also chronicles the rise of Mustafa Kemal Atatürk, the 'Father of the Turkish Nation'.

The book's title is taken from a saying by one of the characters, Iskander the Potter, "Man is a bird without wings, and a bird is a man without sorrows." The book includes a vivid and detailed description of the horrors of life in the trenches during World War I. Some of the characters are also present in the author's earlier novel Captain Corelli's Mandolin.

== Background ==
Kayaköyü, the fictional Eskibahçe

Although fiction, the setting of Eskibahçe is based upon Kayaköy (Greek: Λειβίσσι, romanized: Leivissi) village near Fethiye, the ruins of which still exist today. Once a thriving Greek village, this town of over one thousand houses, two churches, fourteen chapels, and two schools, was completely deserted in 1923. The Greek inhabitants living there, along with a vast number of Greeks living throughout Turkey were deported to Greece through a massive government mandated population exchange between the two countries following the Turkish war of independence. Historically, Turks and Greeks had lived together in this region for centuries, the Turks as farmers in the Kaya valley and the Greeks living on the hillside dealing in crafts and trades. A Greek presence in this region goes back centuries. Since then, the village of Kayakoy, as it is called in Turkish, or Karmylessus, as it was called in Greek, which had been continually inhabited since at least the 13th century, has stood empty and crumbling. And nowadays only the breeze from the mountains and mist from the sea blows through its empty houses and streets. Attempts by the Turkish government to get Turks deported from Greece to inhabit the village failed, and eventually, in the 1950s, the roofs of all the houses were removed.

== Plot summary ==
The novel is set in the fictional village of Eskibahçe in southwestern Anatolia during the final years of the Ottoman Empire and the early 20th century. It follows the lives of the village’s mixed Muslim and Christian population as they are caught up in the wider forces of war, nationalism, and political change. Central to the story are Philothei, a beautiful Christian girl, and Ibrahim, a Muslim boy who falls in love with her. They become engaged, but their future is thrown into uncertainty when Ibrahim is conscripted and is traumatised by his experiences during the First World War.

Other key characters include Karatavuk, a Muslim boy and the son of Eskibahçe’s potter, whose close friendship with the Christian boy Mehmetçik typifies the village’s former relative harmony. Iskander the Potter, Karatavuk’s father, is a respected storyteller and craftsman whose observations frame much of village life. Father Kristoforos and Abdulhamid Hodja, the Christian priest and Muslim imam, each strive to maintain religious leadership within their own communities. Rustem Bey, the local landlord, holds a position of authority in Eskibahçe but is challenged by personal scandal and political changes.

As external events such as the Balkan Wars, the First World War, and the Greco-Turkish War unfold, the stability of Eskibahçe deteriorates. Tensions rise between the Christian Greeks and Muslim Turks, culminating in violence and loss. After the population exchanges mandated by the Treaty of Lausanne, the Christian inhabitants are forced to leave, and the village is left depopulated and transformed. Throughout the narrative there are chapters detailing the personal and political progress of Mustafa Kemal Atatürk culminating in the establishment and modernisation of the Turkish state.

== Characters ==
- Philothei — Most beautiful girl of Eskibahçe
- Ibrahim the Goatherd — Philothei's long standing admirer and betrothed, who becomes crazy upon his return from the war
- Abdulhamid Hodja — The local imam.
- Ayse — Abdulhamid Hodja's wife.
- Charitos — Father of Philothei and Mehmetçik.
- Drosoula — Philothei's best friend. Married to Gerasimos the fisherman.
- Iskander the Potter — Father of Karatavuk and maker of proverbs.
- Karatavuk (Turkish for 'Blackbird') — His real name is Abdul. He is also the youngest son of Iskander the Potter. He fights for the Ottoman Empire in World War I and against the Greeks during the subsequent invasion of Anatolia. After returning home, he loses his right arm when his father (unknowingly) shoots him. As a result, he cannot carry on his father's vocation as potter, and so becomes Karatavuk the Letter-Writer, acting as town scribe.
- Leyla — Rustem Bey's Circassian mistress, who is in fact Greek.
- Mehmetçik (Turkish for 'Red Robin') — Philothei's younger brother and Karatavuk's best friend. His real name is Nicos.
- Mustafa Kemal — Mustafa Kemal Atatürk
- Polyxeni — Mother of Philothei and Mehmetçik. Wife of Charitos. Good friends with Ayse.
- Rustem Bey — the town's wealthy agha.
- Tamara — wife of Rustem.

== Awards ==
The book was shortlisted for the 2004 Whitbread Novel Award and the 2005 Commonwealth Writers Prize (Eurasia Region, Best Book).

== Reception ==
Lavinia Trevor in Publishers Weekly wrote "though some readers may balk at the novel's sheer heft, the reward is an effective and moving portrayal of a way of life—and lives—that might, if not for Bernières's careful exposition and imagination, be lost to memory forever."

Kirkus reviews considered the novel "enormously readable, intermittently brilliant, honorably conceived and felt—and very deeply flawed."

In a mixed review in The Independent, Robert Hanks found that "De Bernières is too fond of telling the reader what to think: it turns out that wars and nationalism are bad, religious tolerance and peace are good, sex and wine are more pleasant than celibacy and abstinence, and that the forms of religion matter less than the spirit behind them. Well I never. Yet the novel is an excellent primer on an episode in history the effects of which are still being felt, but about which I - like, I suspect, most British readers - was shamefully ignorant. Above all, it is a hugely generous, good-natured book: the flaws are massive, but also easy to forgive."
