= Notwithstanding =

2009 short story collection by Louis de Bernières

Notwithstanding: stories from an English Village
- First edition
- Author: Louis de Bernières
- Cover artist: Rob Ryan
- Language: English
- Publisher: Harvill Secker
- Publication date: 2009
- Publication place: United Kingdom
- Media type: Print
- Pages: 275
- ISBN: 1-846-55330-X

Notwithstanding is a short story collection by British author Louis de Bernières. Published in 2009, it was inspired by Hambledon, the Surrey village in which he grew up during the 1960s and 1970s.

== Inspiration ==
In the Afterword to the collection, Louis de Bernières addresses the nation. He looks back wistfully to a time when "Villages were proper communities", with pubs and shops and a rectory "with a proper rector in it". The stories in Notwithstanding, he explains, with just a hint of a huff, are a celebration of the "quirky people" he remembers from his childhood in Surrey: "the belligerent spinsters, the naked generals, the fudge-makers, the people who talked to spiders".

== Stories ==
It contains 20 stories, first publication in brackets :-

- "Archie and the Birds" (Punch, March 1997) - Communicating with his mother via walkie-talkie, the narrator sticks seeds to the living-room window in an attempt to stop his retriever Archie from bringing dead birds into the house.
- "Obadiah Oak, Mrs Griffiths and the Carol Singers" (Country Life, Nov/Dec 1996) - Mrs Griffiths makes punch and mince pies in preparation for the visit of carol singers, but ends up giving them to Obadiah, "the last peasant in the village".
- "Archie and the Woman" (The Independent, 15 August 1998) - Still walkie-talking, the narrator's mother asks him to find a wife. He begins his search with the help of Archie.
- "The Girt Pike" (The London Magazine, Jul/Aug 2002) - How 12-year-old Robert caught the infamous 'Girt pike'.
- "The Auspicious Meeting of the First Two Members of the Famous Notwithstanding Wind Quartet" - The new music teacher, who plays the clarinet stops to help a fellow Morris Minor driver who has broken down, only to find she is collecting pheasant feathers to clean her oboe.
- "Mrs Mac" (Daily Telegraph, 27 Dec 1997) - Amateur spiritualist Mrs Mac, accompanied by her husband, visits his graveside.
- "Colonel Barkwell, Troodos and the Fish" - Colonel Barkwell is suspicious of the poached salmon he has prepared as host of a dinner party, so tests it on his cat Troodos without incident. However, after dinner the cat is reported dead.
- "All My Everlasting Love" - 13-year-old Peter has reached puberty, fallen in love with a friend's sister and left a note in her handbag to meet her on a secluded bench.
- "The Devil and Bessie Maunderfield" - Bessie the new housemaid at Notwistanding Manor catches the eye of Piers De Mandeville, the squire's son, who promises that if he does not marry her then the Devil may have his soul. Bessie falls pregnant and Piers' resolve weakens.
- "The Auspicious Meeting of the Third Member of the Famous Notwithstanding Wind Quartet with the First Two" : Brian and Jenny are practicing Devienne duets, when Jenny's husband catches Piers de Mandeville (a descendant of the Lord of the Manor) loitering in the flowerbed and listening intently.
- "Footprint in the Snow" - The rector is told that Sir Edward Rawton is dying, and needs Communion. Then on Christmas Day the church bells ring what the Rector recognizes as a passing bell for a death.
- "The Happy Death of the General" (Sunday Times, 8 July 2001) - The general often forgets to dress and one day is found in Godalming, naked from the waist down and soon finds himself in Belleview home, the largest house he has ever had with "an enormous staff of servants".
- "Rabbit" (New Writing 10, Picador, March 2001) - The Major puts down a rabbit dying of myxomatosis which brings back unwelcome memories of killing from war.
- "This Beautiful House" (The Times, 18 Dec 2004) - a man considers the house in which he grew up in before a fire started by candles on a Christmas Tree killed himself and his family.
- "Talking to George" : John the gardener complains about his dull life, Alan his assistant is in love with Sylvie the stable girl, and George the spider sits in his web.
- "The Auspicious Meeting of the First Member of the Famous Notwithstanding Wind Quartet with the Fourth" : Jenny now works in a music shop in Goldalming where she is offered a Buffet clarinet to buy, but she is suspicious as it is stamped 'Property of the ILEA'.
- "Silly Bugger (1)" - Robert is given an abandoned rook fledgling to look after which he names Lizzie. His Uncle Dick resolves to teach it to say 'Silly Bugger'.
- "Silly Bugger (2)" - Royston Chittock, having retired to Notwithstanding takes up golf and determines to construct a putting green on his mole-ridden lawn, with the assistance of Dick, with Lizzie making her last appearance as she utters the fateful words 'silly bugger'.
- "The Broken Heart" (Saga Magazine, Jan 2003) - Obadiah Oak's daughter persuades him to sell up and move to Devon, but he cannot let go of his old home.
- "The Death of Miss Agatha Feakes" (BBC Radio 4, 1996) - The last day in the life of the title character and with her menagerie of pets.
- "Afterword" - The author explains his inspiration for the stories in the collection.

== Reception ==
- Ian Sansom in The Guardian writes "Notwithstanding is a village where "strange things happen from time to time". There is a case of suspected food poisoning. Someone kills a rabbit. Someone catches a fish. A grumpy old lady sends Christmas cards. All the stories have that well-told, underwritten quality of the fairytale or the fable: occasionally, and at their very best, they also have the necessary fairytale bite and discomfort...The experience of reading this collection is rather like being wrapped in a tartan blanket and handed a nice mug of cocoa. Treats on offer include the adventures of Colonel Pericles "Perry" Barkwell, tales of the pipe-smoking Polly Wantage, and the sorry story of the poor old general who is slowly losing his mind. There is a mysterious "hedging and ditching" man and a dog called Archibald Scott-Moncrieff. And of course Obadiah Oak, the village's literal and proverbial last peasant, who "exudes the aromas of wet leather and horse manure, costive dogs, turnips, rainwater and cabbage water, sausages, verdigris, woollen socks, Leicester cheese, fish guts, fraying curtains, mice under the stairs, mud on the carpet and woodlice behind the pipes"."
- Carol Ann Duffy in The Telegraph notes "de Bernières here has his eye and ear firmly on English eccentricity and individualism. His intention may well have been to make the familiar strange, but his stories achieve the opposite. While not quite the vanished world that the author feels it to be – the emotional intensity of de Bernières’s sense of the “better laughter, warmer rain” of the past serves up a comforting fictional world that his many loyal readers will find delicious" and concludes "it is interesting that the most haunting stories, literally, are about ghosts: a woman who lives happily with the ghost of her dead husband; a man’s death protectively foretold by the spirit of his grandmother. It is here that de Bernières’s sentimental attachment to his lost boyhood village comes closest to narrowing the gap between then and now."
