= The Troublesome Offspring of Cardinal Guzman =

1992 novel by Louis de Bernières

- First edition
- Author: Louis de Bernières
- Language: English
- Genre: Magic Realism
- Publisher: Secker & Warburg
- Publication date: 24 aug 1992
- Publication place: United Kingdom
- Media type: Print
- Pages: 400
- ISBN: 0-436-20114-3
- Preceded by: The War of Don Emmanuel's Nether Parts & Señor Vivo and the Coca Lord

The Troublesome Offspring of Cardinal Guzman is a novel by Louis de Bernières, first published in 1992. It is the last of his Latin American trilogy, following on from The War of Don Emmanuel's Nether Parts and Señor Vivo and the Coca Lord.

== Setting ==
Set in an imagined Latin American country the novel's political themes parody the worst excesses of the Pinochet government of Chile, the collapse of democratic social order in Uruguay in the 1970s and other dirty wars of the 1960s to 1980s in Southern and Central America. The main action of the story takes place in the small town of Cochadebajo de los Gatos, where the characters of the previous books have settled. As in the previous two books, affectionate character portraits of the townsfolk make up a large part of the novel. Other parts of the novel take place in the capital city of the fictional nation, in the clubs of the corrupt military commanders, and the palace of the distracted, amoral president.

Although the name of the country of the trilogy is never directly disclosed, several reasons cause it to most resemble that of Colombia. De Bernieres' experiences from spending time living in Colombia will probably have influenced its setting. Geographically, references are made to the country's equatorial climate, its northern coastline on the Caribbean, western coastline on the Pacific Ocean and the mountain range of the Sierra Nevada de Santa Margarita, which is similar to the Sierra Nevada de Santa Marta. The Colombian town of Valledupar, in the Cesar Department, and Medellín are commonly mentioned, and the fictional town of Chiriguana bears the same name as the Colombian Chiriguana. In the second novel, Señor Vivo and the Coca Lord, the notorious Colombian drug lord Pablo Escobar is a central character. The book sarcastically describes the 'democratic' politics of the country as the result of 'La Violencia', whereby two political parties jointly ruled on alternating administrations. There is a clear parallel between this and the National Front regime of Colombia, which followed on from La Violencia and lasted from 1958 to 1974, in which the Liberal and Conservative parties governed jointly.

== Plot ==
Cardinal Guzman lives extravagantly in the capital, and immorally, due to the discoveries of his having had a young son and his loathing of the poor shanty-dwellers who live below his palace. Despite the downfall of El Jerarca in Señor Vivo and the Coca Lord, the drug trade continues and the economy of the country spirals ever downward. Cardinal Guzman's clergy and the corrupt military of the country set out to destroy the heresy of the countryside, and, more specifically, Cochadebajo de los Gatos, home of Dionisio and many of the other characters. In so doing the hypocrisy of the Cardinal's faith with his own promiscuity is revealed.

== Style ==
De Bernières pays obvious homage to Latin American magic realism, in particular the comic awareness of life's transcendence which characterises the work of Gabriel García Márquez. However, his political themes are clear and unambiguous.
