= The War of Don Emmanuel's Nether Parts =

1990 novel by Louis de Bernières

- First edition
- Author: Louis de Bernières
- Language: English
- Genre: Magic Realism
- Publisher: Secker and Warburg
- Publication date: 6 Aug 1990
- Publication place: United Kingdom
- Media type: Print
- Pages: 384
- ISBN: 0-436-20003-1
- Followed by: Señor Vivo and the Coca Lord & The Troublesome Offspring of Cardinal Guzman

The War of Don Emmanuel's Nether Parts is a novel by Louis de Bernières, first published in 1990. It is the first of his Latin American trilogy. The other two parts are Señor Vivo and the Coca Lord and The Troublesome Offspring of Cardinal Guzman.

== Setting ==
Set in an imagined Latin American country, the novel's political themes parody the worst excesses of the Pinochet government of Chile, the collapse of democratic social order in Uruguay in the 1970s, the Colombian Armed Conflict between the military and communist guerrillas and other dirty wars of the 1960s to 1980s in Southern and Central America. The main action of the story takes place in the small town of Chiriguaná, whose population is richly drawn in affectionate character portraits that make up a large part of the novel. Other parts of the novel take place in the capital city of the fictional nation, in the clubs of the corrupt military commanders, and the palace of the distracted, amoral president.

Although the name of the country of the trilogy is never directly disclosed, several reasons cause it to most resemble Colombia. De Bernières' experiences from spending time living in Colombia will probably have influenced its setting. Geographically, references are made to the country's equatorial climate, its northern coastline on the Caribbean, western coastline on the Pacific Ocean and the mountain range of the Sierra Nevada de Santa Margarita, which is similar to the Sierra Nevada de Santa Marta. The Colombian town of Valledupar, in the Cesar Department, and Medellín are commonly mentioned, and the fictional town of Chiriguaná bears the same name as the Colombian town Chiriguaná. In the sequel to the novel, Señor Vivo and the Coca Lord, the notorious Colombian drug lord Pablo Escobar (thinly disguised under a pseudonym) is a central character. The book sarcastically describes the 'democratic' politics of the country as the result of 'La Violencia', whereby two political parties jointly ruled on alternating administrations. There is a clear parallel between this and the National Front regime of Colombia, which followed on from La Violencia and lasted from 1958 to 1974, in which the Liberal and Conservative parties governed jointly.

== Plot summary ==
The town of Chiriguaná is threatened with rape and murder by the caprices of the thuggish Capitan Figueras, and drought, thanks to the spoilt Doña Constanza's plan to divert the Mula river in order to feed her swimming pool. When Doña Constanza is kidnapped by communist guerillas and held for ransom, the unkindness she had shown towards her tenants leads them to celebrate a three-day long fiesta.

Several chapters focus on individual characters, from those detailing the life of Aurelio, the magical Sierra-turned-Jungle Indian, to those involving Chiriguaná, to letters home to France from Antoine, and to those of the guerilla characters.

In the capital of the nation, the handsome young Capitan Asado is promoted to Colonel and given orders from the highest positions in the military to eliminate subversives and communists through whatever means necessary. After initial distress, Colonel Asado hardens, his objectives change, and thousands of ordinary civilians are kidnapped during the night and driven in Ford Falcons to army buildings where they are systematically tortured and killed.

Journalists and relatives who report the kidnappings are abducted themselves, and the capital of the nation becomes lawless and fearful. The escapades and political in-fighting of the divided and deeply corrupt military drive the people of Chiriguaná to fight the army, and after the battle, to flee, en masse, in an exodus to the mountains.

Guided by Aurelio, and accompanied by a mysterious host of cats, the townspeople travel away from the degenerate civilisation of Chiriguaná towards a new civilization rooted in past magic and majesty. Shortly after their departure, an earthquake triggers a great tsunami, which destroys a vast area of the Mula Basin jungles. Due to Aurelio's premonition of it, they observe the event from higher ground.

The long journey takes the townspeople across high plateaus and through tropical jungles, and at its end Don Emmanuel and Aurelio traverse a glacier to navigate over a mountain. An avalanche occurs, which both men miraculously survive, and exposes hundreds of long-buried colonial Spanish conquistadors and their hundreds of Indian slaves, who had been perfectly preserved in ice for centuries.

The earthquake earlier in the journey had burst the dam of a lake-filled valley, situated over the mountain Don Emmanuel and Aurelio climbed. The draining of the valley had exposed the remnants of an Inca town, partially buried in mud. At the valley end there is a cliff dropping down to the jungle below, which lies under deposited mud from the burst dam. The townspeople clear the mud from the buildings in the Inca town, and the new town is subsequently named Cochadebajo de los Gatos after the Inca stone statues of jaguars which line it. The mud deposited on the flattened jungle below the valley provides fertile farmland for the new town, and mud-brick terraces are built on which to grow crops. The conquistadores are brought back to life by Aurelio and, after initial rampant chaos, eventually adapt to their new lives alongside the main characters in the new town.

== Style ==
De Bernières pays obvious homage to Latin American magic realism, in particular the comic awareness of life's transcendence which characterises the work of Gabriel García Márquez. However, his political themes are clear and unambiguous.
