= Señor Vivo and the Coca Lord =

1991 novel by Louis de Bernières

- First edition
- Author: Louis de Bernières
- Language: English
- Genre: Magic Realism
- Publisher: Secker and Warburg
- Publication date: 10 June 1991
- Publication place: United Kingdom
- Media type: Print
- Pages: 288
- ISBN: 0-436-20008-2
- Preceded by: The War of Don Emmanuel's Nether Parts
- Followed by: The Troublesome Offspring of Cardinal Guzman

Señor Vivo and the Coca Lord is a novel by Louis de Bernières, first published in 1991. It is the second of his Latin American trilogy, following on from The War of Don Emmanuel's Nether Parts and preceding The Troublesome Offspring of Cardinal Guzman.

== Setting ==
Set in an imagined Latin American country the novel's political themes parody the worst excesses of the Pinochet government of Chile, the collapse of democratic social order in Uruguay in the 1970s, and other dirty wars of the 1960s to 1980s in Southern and Central America. The story follows the exploits of drug cartels in trying to silence a young philosophy professor, the eponymous Senor Vivo, who attracts a large following through his constant criticism of the drug trade. It also revisits the former inhabitants of the small town of Chiriguaná, who newly founded the township of Cochadebajo de los Gatos in the previous book. Other parts of the novel take place in the capital city of the fictional nation, in the clubs of the corrupt military commanders, and the palace of the distracted, amoral president.

Although the name of the country of the trilogy is never directly disclosed, several reasons cause it to most resemble that of Colombia. De Bernieres' experiences from spending time living in Colombia will probably have influenced its setting. Geographically, references are made to the country's equatorial climate, its northern coastline on the Caribbean, western coastline on the Pacific Ocean and the mountain range of the Sierra Nevada de Santa Margarita, which is similar to the Sierra Nevada de Santa Marta. The Colombian town of Valledupar, in the Cesar Department, and Medellín are commonly mentioned, and the fictional town of Chiriguana in the first book bears the same name as the Colombian Chiriguana. In Señor Vivo and the Coca Lord, the notorious Colombian drug lord Pablo Escobar is a central character. The book sarcastically describes the 'democratic' politics of the country as the result of 'La Violencia', whereby two political parties jointly ruled on alternating administrations. There is a clear parallel between this and the National Front regime of Colombia, which followed on from La Violencia and lasted from 1958 to 1974, in which the Liberal and Conservative parties governed jointly.

== Plot introduction ==
When the philosophy lecturer Dionisio Vivo confronts drug lords and the government through letters and a series of newspaper articles in La Prensa, he becomes the enemy of the ruthless coca lord El Jerarca, the character of which is probably based on the notorious Colombian drug lord Pablo Escobar. His implausible escapes from the assassins sent by El Jerarca compel the people of the country to regard him as a magical 'brujo' and the saviour to their conflict and poverty. Indeed, hundreds of women follow him in a pilgrimage across the country, each carrying the hope of bearing his child. His excellency President Veracruz attempts to put an end to the country's soaring inflation through a series of foolishly unrealistic measures, and searches for spiritual enlightenment with his ex-prostitute wife through magical potions and alchemy. An array of prostitutes, guerrillas and townspeople from the first book re-appear throughout.

== Style ==
De Bernières pays obvious homage to Latin American magic realism, in particular the comic awareness of life's transcendence which characterises the work of Gabriel García Márquez. However, his political themes are clear and unambiguous.
