= Carmylessus =

Ancient town of Lycia

Coordinates: 36°34′28″N 29°05′25″E

Carmylessus or Karmylessos (Ancient Greek: Καρμυλησσός) was a town of ancient Lycia, described by Strabo between Telmissus and the mouth of the Xanthus. After Telmissus, he says, then Anticragus (Ancient Greek: Ἀντίκραγος), an abrupt mountain on which is the small place Carmylessus, lying in a ravine.

The editors of the Barrington Atlas of the Greek and Roman World identify Kaya, Fethiye as the location of the ancient city, while the Lund University Atlas of the Roman World tentatively place it at Kayaköy.
