= Ovacık, Fethiye =

Neighborhood in Fethiye, Muğla Province, Turkey

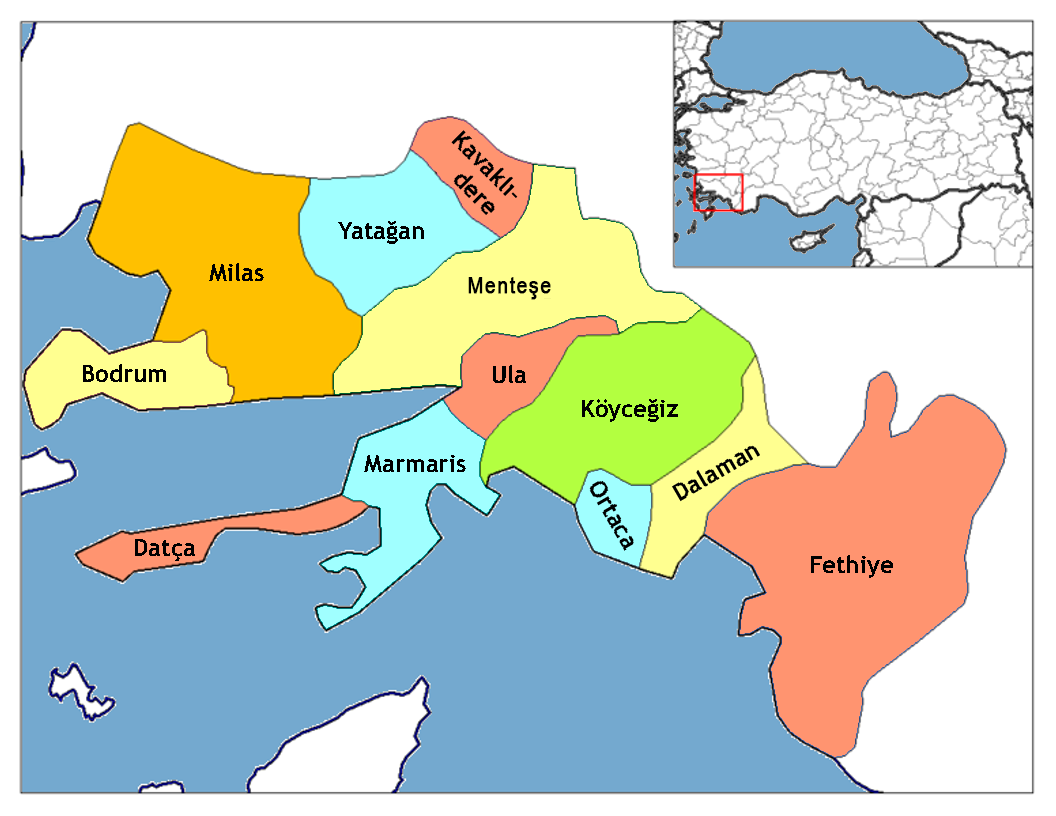
A map of the districts of Muğla province in Turkey.

Ovacık is a settlement in Fethiye district on the Turkish Riviera, Muğla Province, Turkey. It is part of the neighbourhood Ölüdeniz. It is located next to the residential neighborhood and holiday resort of Hisarönü, which consists mainly of small hotels and private villas. The village has restaurants, and is generally quieter than Hisarönü.

== Location ==
Ovacık village is located on a small plateau at the foot of Babadağ mountain (Turkish: father mountain), the preferred spot for paragliders, near the blue lagoon of Ölüdeniz and Belcekız beach.

The village is about 5 km away from Ölüdeniz, 9 km from Fethiye city center, and 100 km from the city of Muğla.
