= Captain Corelli's Mandolin =

1994 novel by Louis de Bernières

- First Edition
- Author: Louis de Bernières
- Language: English
- Genre: Historical, Romance, War novel
- Publisher: Secker & Warburg
- Publication date: 1994
- Publication place: United Kingdom
- Media type: Print (hardback & paperback)
- Pages: 544
- ISBN: 0-436-20158-5

Captain Corelli's Mandolin, released simultaneously in the United States as Corelli's Mandolin, is a 1994 novel by the British writer Louis de Bernières, set on the Greek island of Cephalonia during the Italian and German occupation of the Second World War. In 2003, the novel was listed at number 19 on the BBC's survey The Big Read.

== Synopsis ==
Dr. Iannis resides on the Greek island of Cephalonia with his daughter Pelagia, who has acquired medical knowledge through her observations of her father's practice. Pelagia becomes romantically involved with a young fisherman named Mandras, and they become engaged just as World War II breaks out. Mandras decides to join the fight on the front lines, leaving Pelagia anxiously awaiting his letters, which never arrive. Meanwhile, Carlo Guercio, a closeted homosexual, fights alongside the Italian forces invading Albania and witnesses the tragic death of his beloved Francesco, for whom he harbors deep affection, at the hands of the Greek army.

In 1941, Italian and German soldiers are posted to Cephalonia, where they are ostracized by the locals. Pelagia is determined to hate them, especially when a young captain named Antonio Corelli is domiciled with her. Mandras comes home from the war and Pelagia realizes she no longer loves him. Mandras leaves for the Greek mainland, where he joins the communist partisan organisation ELAS. But this Greek resistance group is cruel towards the civilian population and frequently attacks other partisan groups for being ideologically no different than the Axis's occupying forces.

When Italy surrenders, their former German allies turn on them. After defeating the Italian division, the German soldiers on Cephalonia carry out a massive execution. Corelli's life is saved by Carlo Guercio, who shields him with his body when they face execution by firing squad. Guercio dies, and the wounded Corelli is aided by a Greek back to Pelagia's house. Corelli has to stay hidden from the Germans, whose orders are to kill any surviving Italians.

As soon as he is well enough, Corelli escapes to Italy, promising Pelagia that he will return as soon as the war ends and then they will be married. Corelli leaves "Antonia," his mandolin, with Pelagia for safekeeping.

The war eventually ends and communists take over the island. Dr Iannis is considered an intellectual, therefore suspect, and is sent to a camp along with some of his friends, who protest against his treatment. Mandras returns, having learned to read, indoctrinated with Communist ideologies. He has read Pelagia's letters and knows that she does not love him, so he tries unsuccessfully to rape her. Mandras' mother realizes what almost happened and repudiates her own son. Ashamed, he commits suicide. Mandras' mother comforts Pelagia and remains close with Pelagia for the remainder of her life.

Some time after, a baby girl is left on Pelagia's doorstep, who Pelagia adopts. Dr Iannis comes home, traumatised. The baby girl, whom Pelagia has named Antonia, grows up and marries. Antonia later has a son who is named Iannis in honor of the doctor.

Many years later, Corelli, now a famous mandolin player, visits Pelagia one last time.

== Real story and precedents ==
Bernières has denied that the character of Corelli is based on Amos Pampaloni who was then an Italian artillery captain in Cephalonia, despite the many similarities in their stories. Pampaloni survived execution, joined the Greek People's Liberation Army, the Partisans in the Greek civil war, and fought with them in Epirus for fourteen months. Pampaloni was interviewed by The Guardian newspaper in 2000 and expressed the view that the novel misrepresented the Greek partisan movement.

The novel also shows some similarities to Bandiera bianca a Cefalonia, a novel by Marcello Venturi published in 1963, translated in English as The White Flag (1969).

== Reception ==
The Orlando Sentinel called Corelli's Mandolin a "radically traditionalist" novel, "a good nourishing tale full of true things, historical and psychological, spiced with opinion and contrariness, with not one dollop of regard for artistic fashion."

The Cleveland Plain Dealer praised the multiple emotional levels of the novel, remarking, "Like Puccini, de Bernières can evoke golden narrative, full of both pain and gladness."

Gene Hyde wrote, "To defy Sisyphus and rebel against the absurd, especially in the face of war, is an excruciatingly difficult and noble task. The beauty of Bernières' unique and deeply moving novel is his insistence that our hope lies in these seemingly quixotic impulses."

== Awards ==
- 1995 – Commonwealth Writers Prize for Best Book
- 2003 – 19th place on The Big Read

== Adaptations ==
=== Radio ===
The novel was adapted as four 45-minute radio plays from 17 to 20 September 2007 on BBC Radio 4, having been chosen as a popular "Book of the Week" on the same station some years earlier. The episode titles were "A Pea in the Ear," "Invasion of the Italians," "Looking for Snails" and "Earthquake." It was narrated by Tom Goodman-Hill, with Celia Meiras as Pelagia, Stephen Greif as Dr Iannis, Daniel Philpott as Corelli. The mandolin music for it was composed and performed by Alison Stephens, and the production was produced and directed by David Hunter. Other cast members included:

- Carlo – Anthony Psaila
- Mandras – Chris Pavlo
- Velisarios – Alexi Kaye Campbell
- Father Arsenios – Alex Zorbas
- Lemoni – Ania Gordon
- Drosoula – Anna Savva
- Hector – Nitin Ganatra
- Officer – Simon Treves

=== Film ===
A film version of Captain Corelli's Mandolin was released in 2001, with Nicolas Cage as the Italian Captain Corelli, John Hurt as Dr Iannis, and Penélope Cruz as his daughter, Pelagia. The film, directed by John Madden, also starred Christian Bale and Irene Papas.

=== Theatre ===
In 2011, the Mercury Theatre in Colchester, England, and the Kote Marjanishvili Theatre of Tbilisi, Georgia, produced an adaptation of the novel written by Mike Maran and directed by Levan Tsuladze. This production combined live actors and puppetry. It had its premiere in Georgia at the Tbilisi International Festival in October 2011, before transferring to the Mercury.

A new stage adaptation by Rona Munro and directed by Melly Still previews at the Leicester Curve from 13 to 20 April 2019 before opening at the Rose Theatre, Kingston (23 April to 12 May), and touring to Theatre Royal, Bath (14 to 18 May), Birmingham Repertory Theatre (29 May to 15 June), King's Theatre, Edinburgh (18 to 22 June) and Theatre Royal, Glasgow (25 to 29 June). Following its UK tour, the production transferred to London's West End at the Harold Pinter Theatre from 4 July to 31 August 2019 starring Alex Mugnaioni as Captain Antonio Corelli and Madison Clare as Pelagia.

=== Illustrated Book (Comic) ===
In 2024, CYRESSA published a graphic novel adaptation of Louis de Bernières' novel Captain Corrlli’s Mandolin, illustrated by Arnaud Ribadeau Dumas.
