= Ölüdeniz =

- Neighbourhood
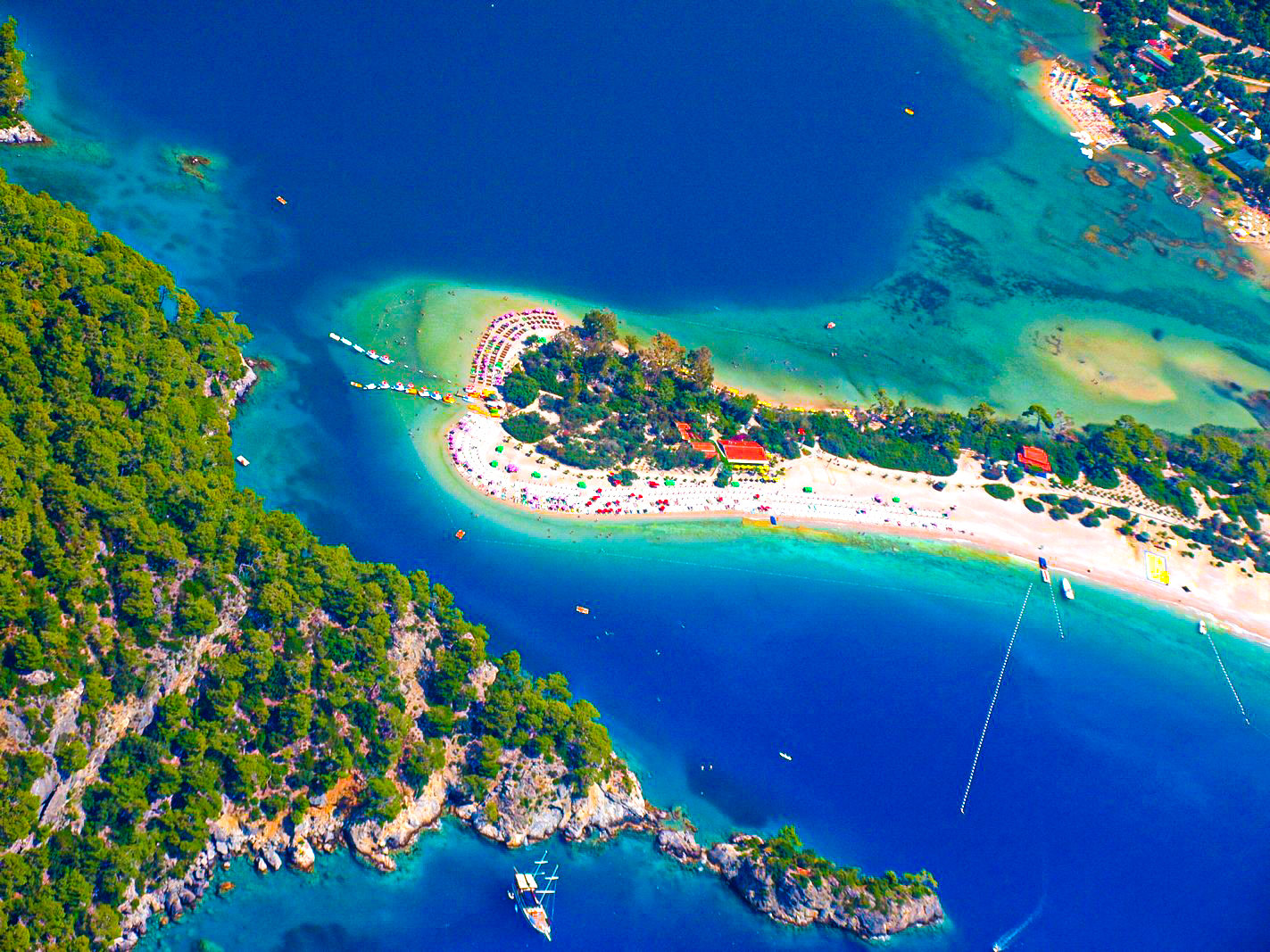
- A view of Ölüdeniz

- Location within Turkey Location within Turkey Aegean
- Coordinates: 36°34′15″N 29°08′33″E
- Country: Turkey
- Province: Muğla
- District: Fethiye
- Population (2022): 6,132
- Time zone: UTC+3 (TRT)
- Postal code: 48300
- Area code: 0252

Ölüdeniz (literally "Dead Sea", due to its calm waters even during storms; official translation: Blue Lagoon) is a town of the municipality and district of Fethiye, Muğla Province, Turkey. Its population is 6,132 (2022). Before the 2013 reorganisation, it was a town (belde). It is a beach resort on the Turkish Riviera, at the conjunction point of the Aegean and Mediterranean seas. It is located 14 km (9 mi) south of Fethiye, near Mount Babadağ.

It has a sandy bay at the mouth of Ölüdeniz, on a blue lagoon. The beach itself is a pebble beach. The lagoon is a national nature reserve and construction is strictly prohibited. The seawater of Ölüdeniz is famous for its shades of turquoise and aquamarine, while its beach is an official Blue Flag beach.

== Paragliding ==
Ölüdeniz is also famous for its paragliding opportunities. It is a popular site due to its views, stable weather conditions, and Mount Babadağ's exceptional height. The possibility to fly above water makes it also a prime location for SIV (safety training) and paragliding acrobatics.

== Ultramarathon ==
Since 2010, an international multiday trail running ultramarathon, called Lycian Way Ultramarathon, is held on the historical Lycian Way. The event runs eastward on a route of around 220–240 km (140–150 mi) from Ölüdeniz to Antalya in six days.

== Scuba diving ==
Ölüdeniz offer a variety of diving opportunities with regard to its crystal clear waters and rich underwater caves and fauna. Scuba diving is the most popular underwater activity. Local diving agencies provide courses and required scuba diving licences. Snorkelling is another diving activity and many sites are very suitable for snorkelling.

== See also ==
- Butterfly Valley, Fethiye

== Gallery ==
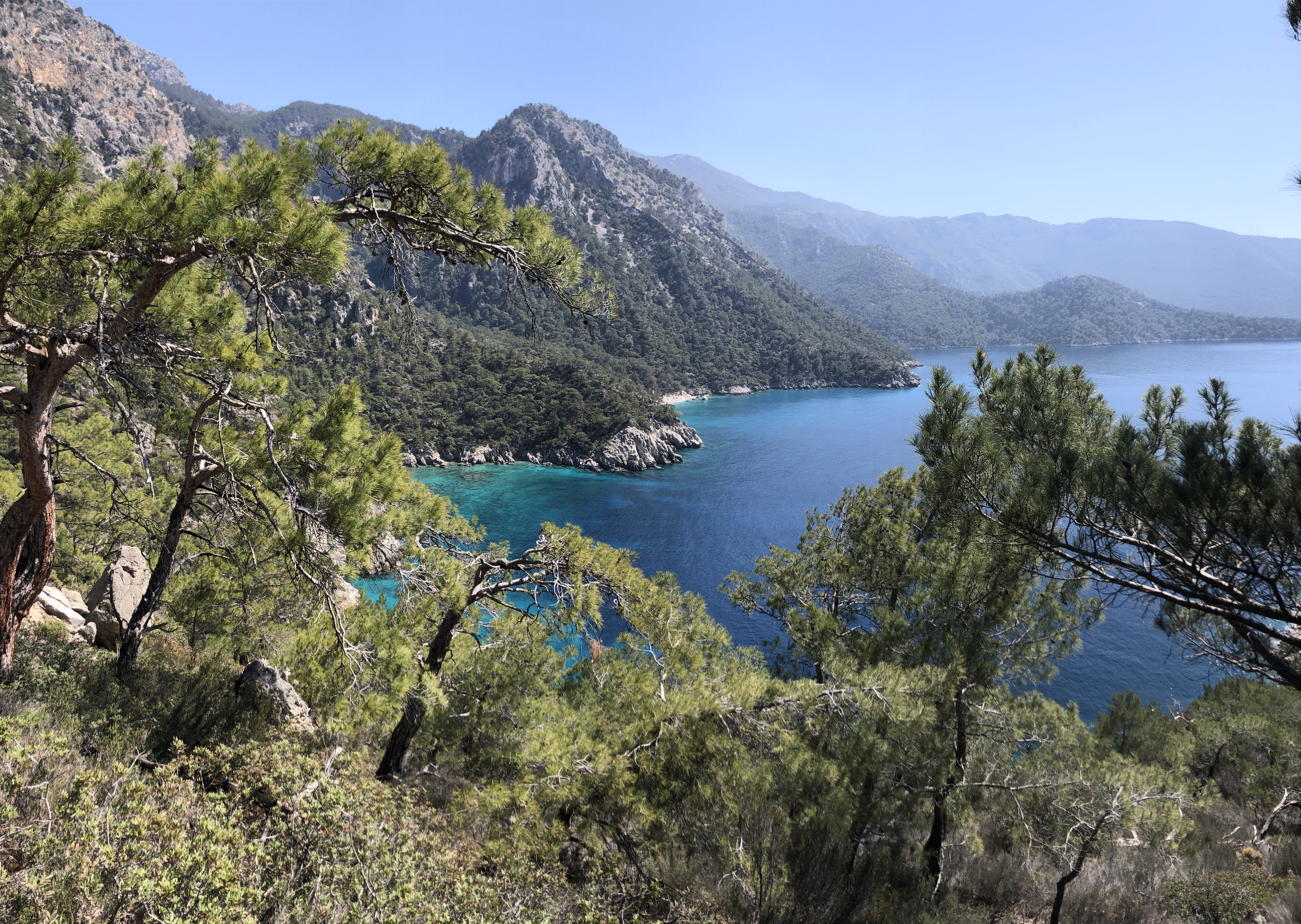
Ölüdeniz

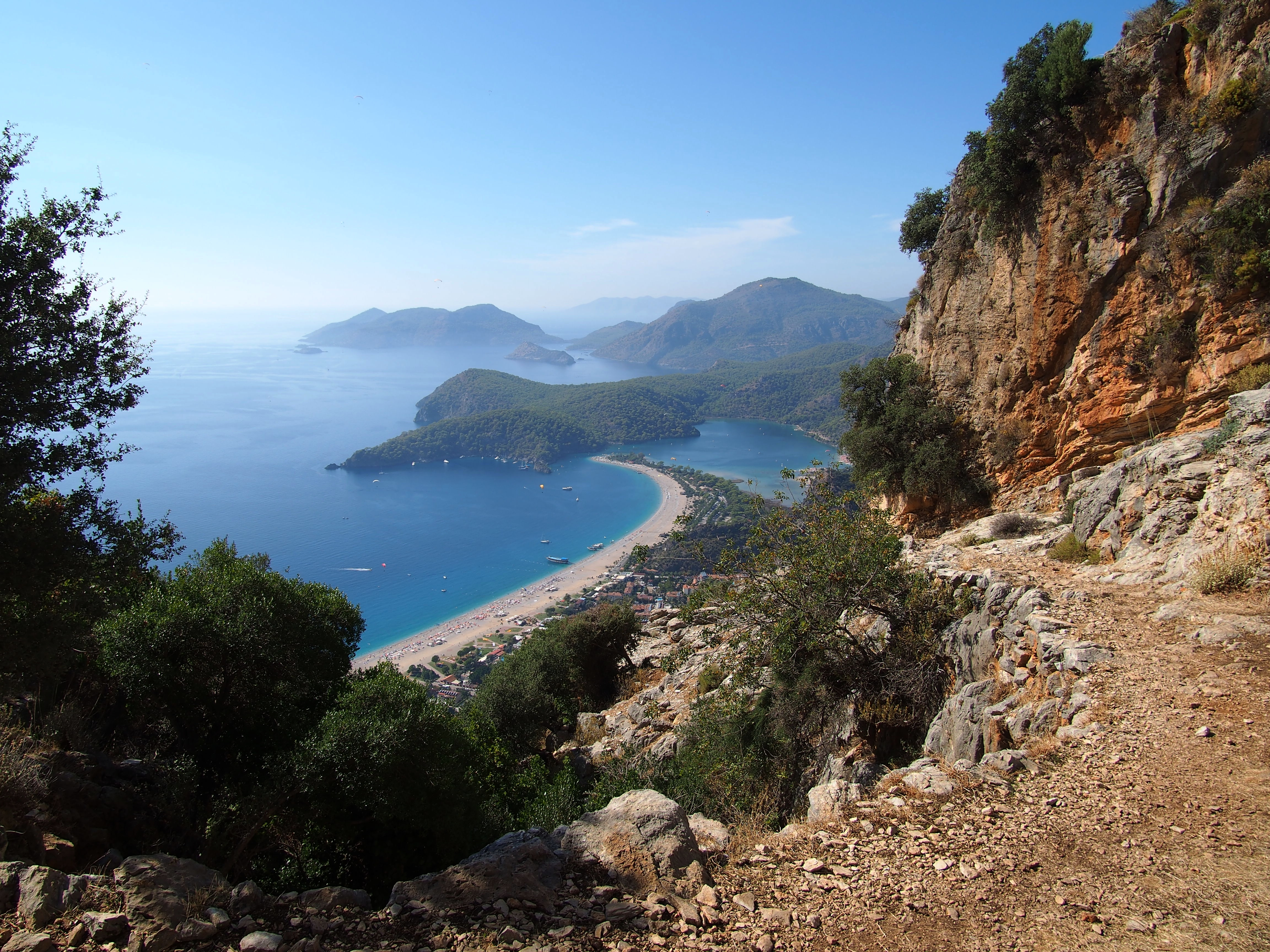
The Blue Lagoon

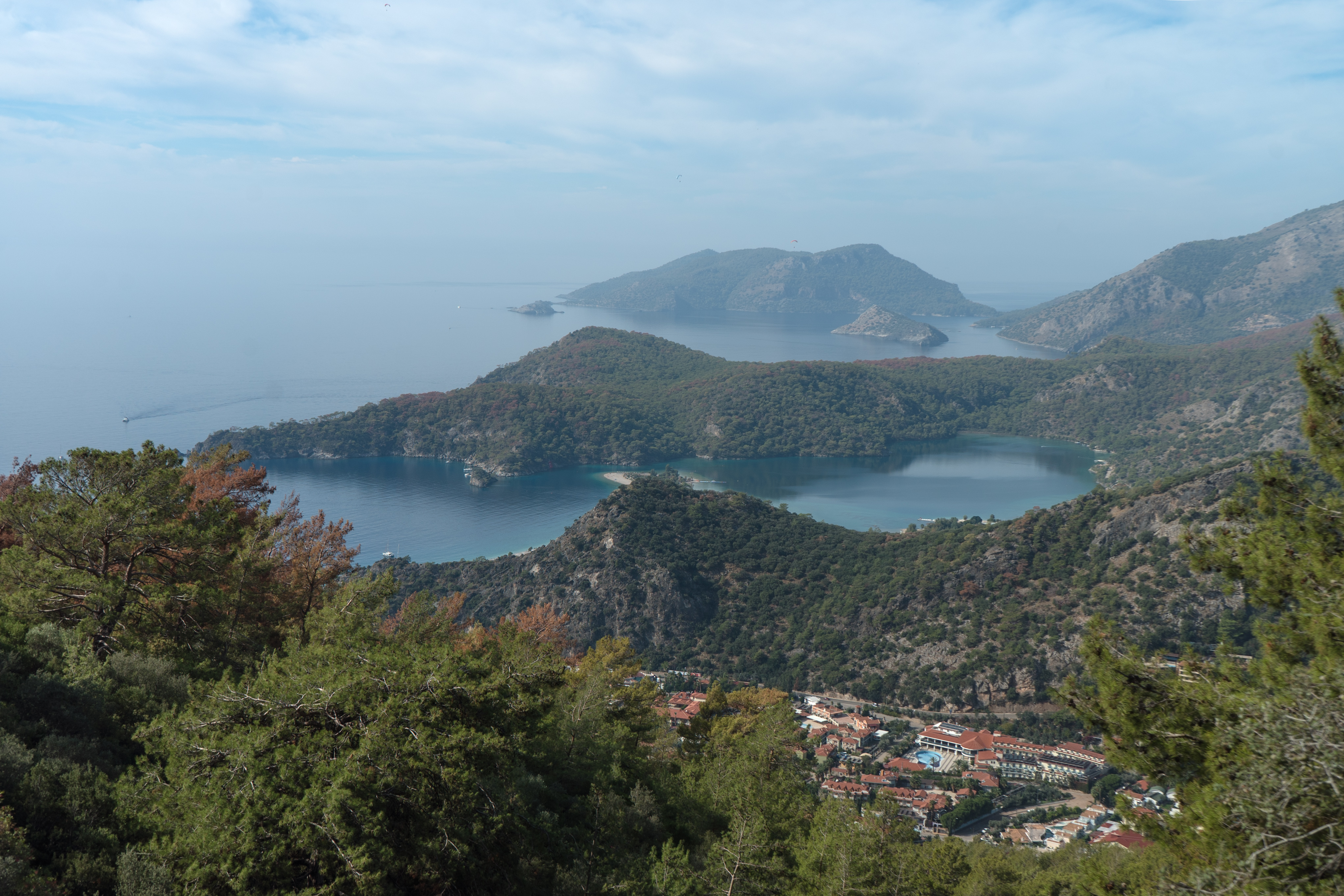
Lycian Way

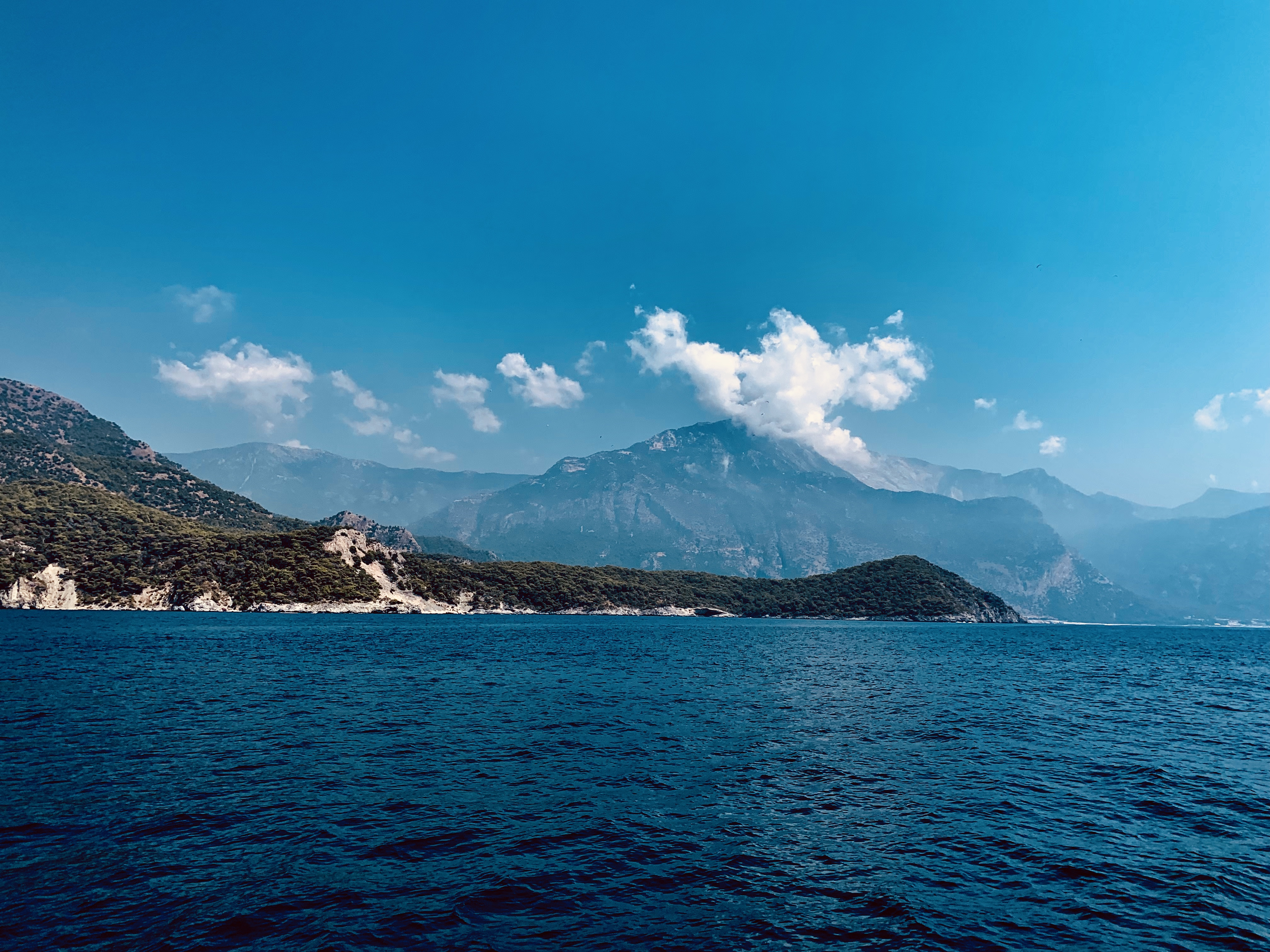
Ölüdeniz

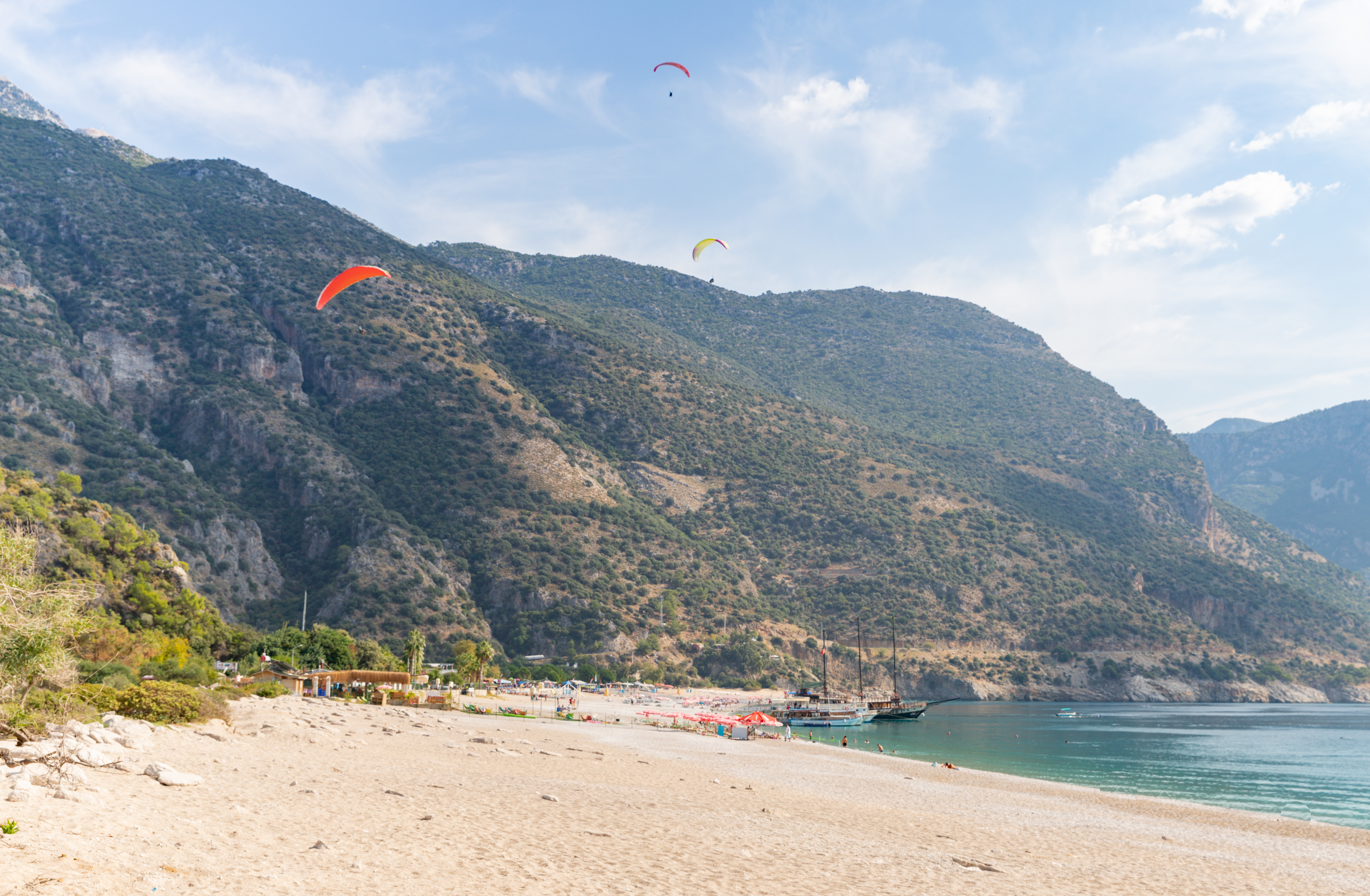
Ölüdeniz Beach

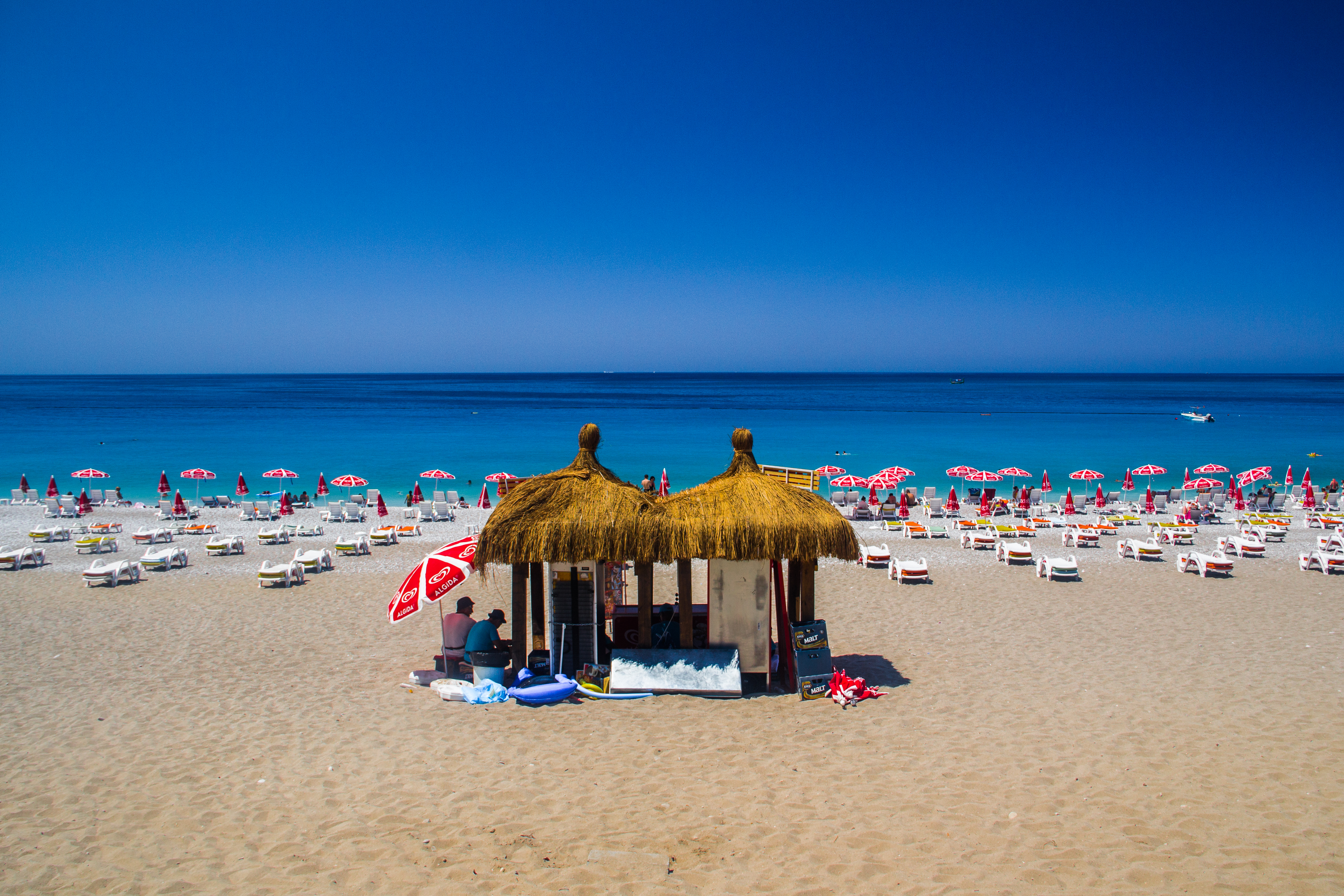
Ölüdeniz Beach

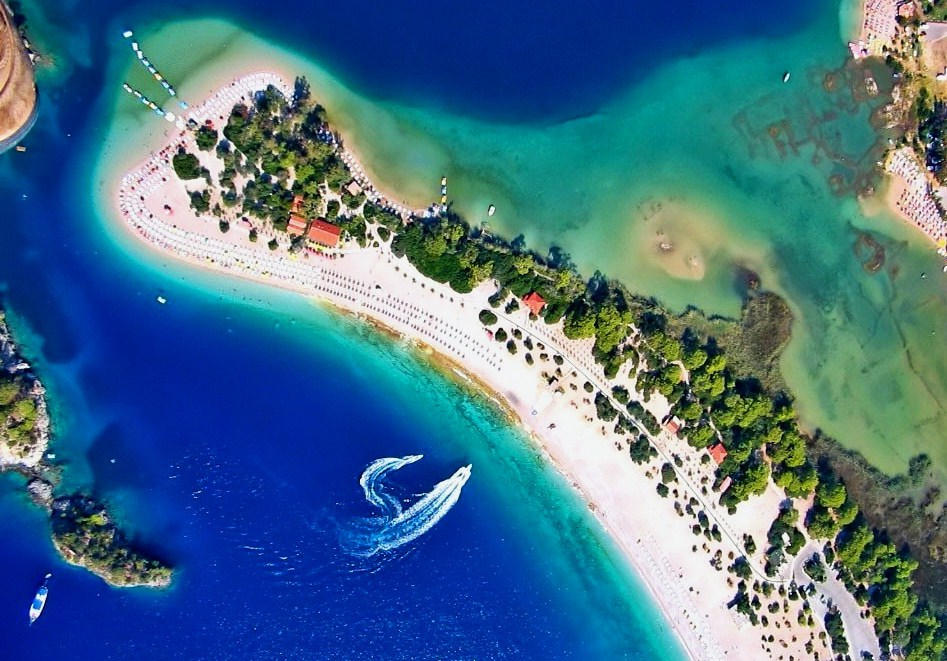
Ölüdeniz Beach

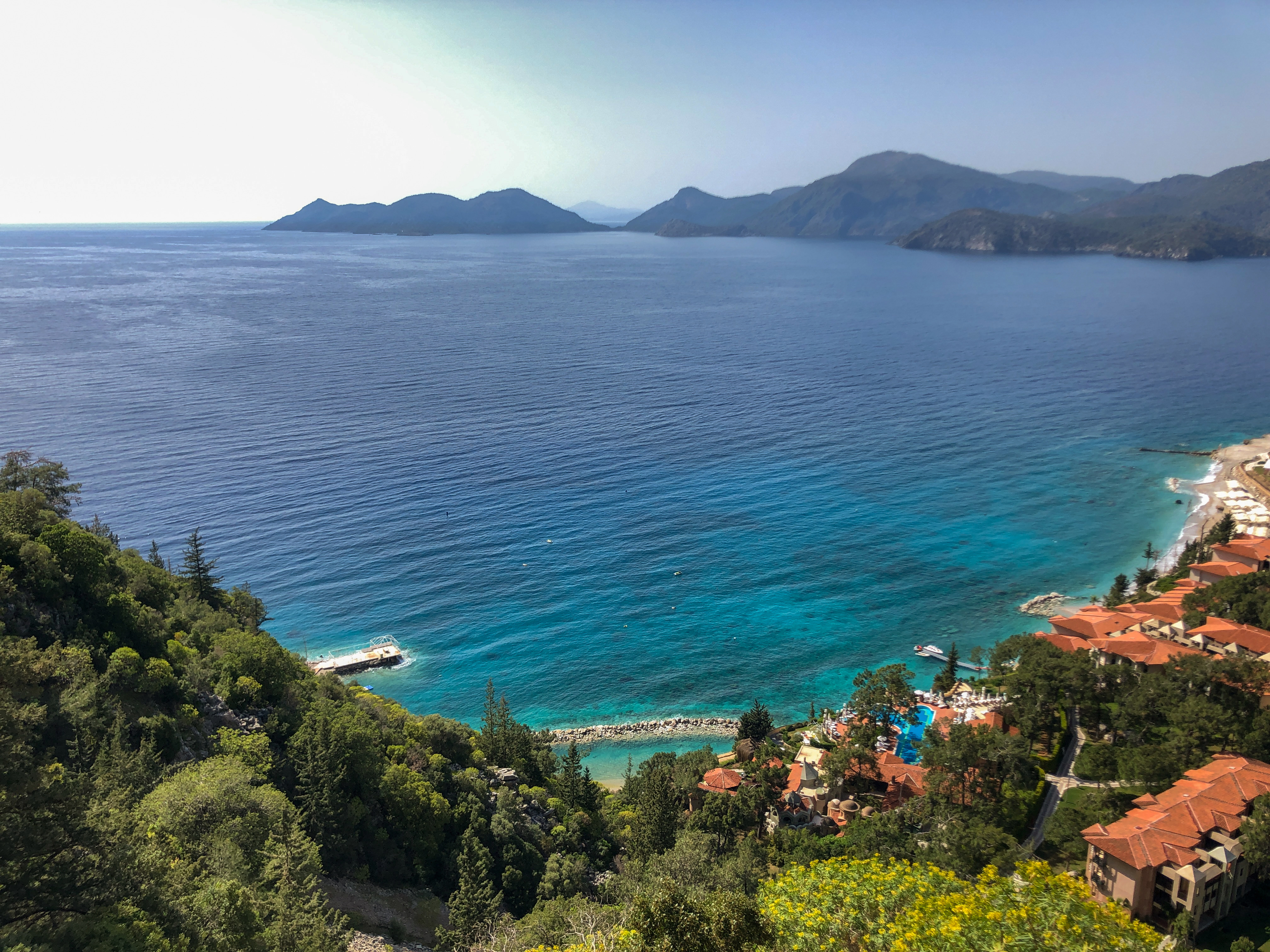
Ölüdeniz view

== Climate ==
Ölüdeniz has typical Mediterranean climate. The weather is warm all year round, but in the summer temperatures often surpass 35 °C (95 °F).

Climate data for Ölüdeniz
Month	Jan	Feb	Mar	Apr	May	Jun	Jul	Aug	Sep	Oct	Nov	Dec	Year
Mean daily maximum °C (°F)	16 (61)	17 (63)	20 (68)	21 (70)	25 (77)	30 (86)	34 (93)	34 (93)	31 (88)	26 (79)	22 (72)	18 (64)	25 (76)
Mean daily minimum °C (°F)	7 (45)	7 (45)	10 (50)	12 (54)	15 (59)	20 (68)	22 (72)	22 (72)	21 (70)	17 (63)	13 (55)	10 (50)	15 (59)

== See also ==
- Blue Cruise
- Foreign purchases of real estate in Turkey
- Hisarönü and Ovacık, two nearby towns which form part of Ölüdeniz Municipality
- Marinas in Turkey
- Turkish Riviera
