= Louis de Bernières =

English novelist (born 1954)

Louis de Bernières FRSL
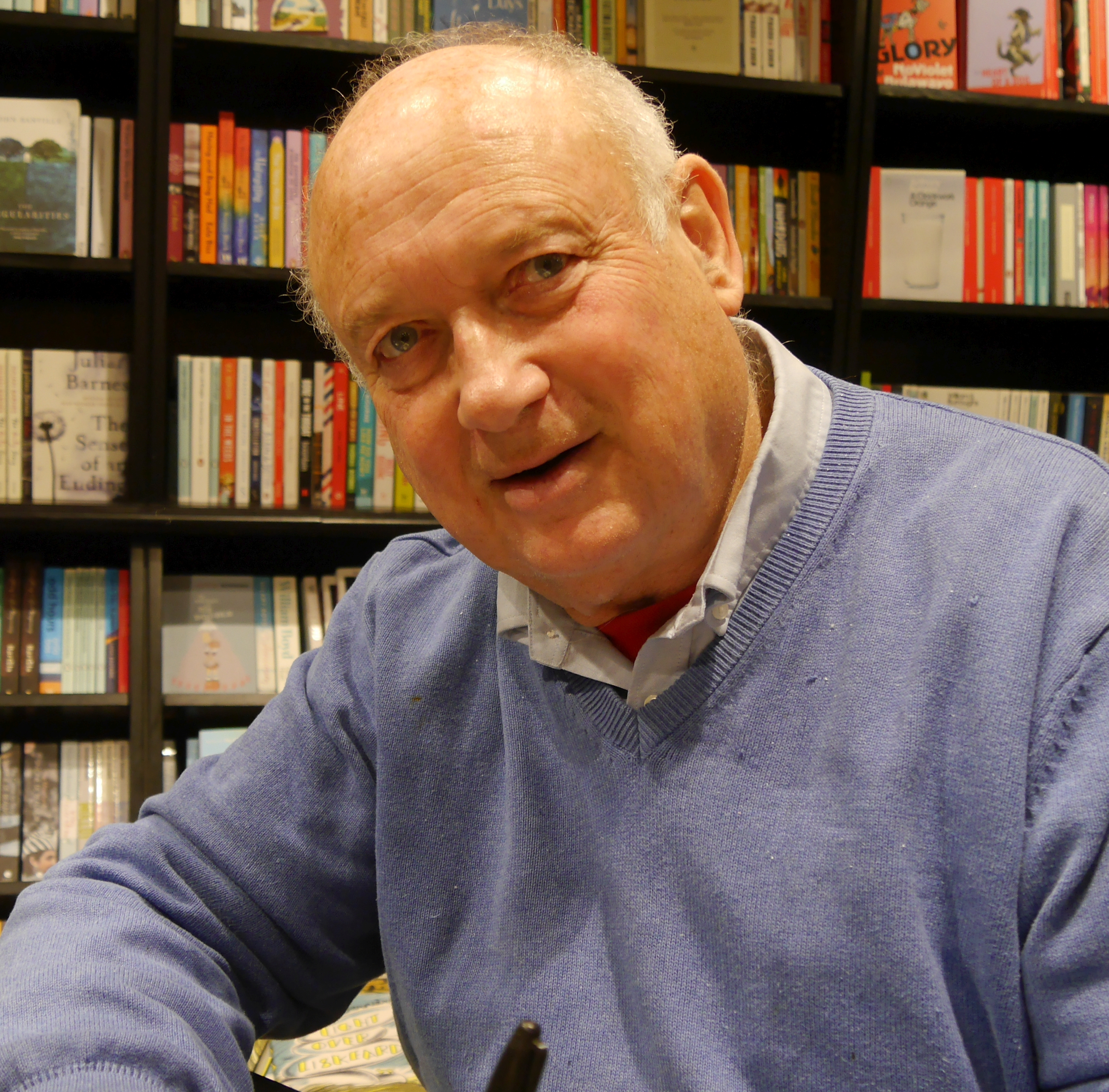
- De Bernières in 2023
- Born: 8 December 1954 (age 71); Woolwich, London, England
- Occupation: Novelist
- Writing career
- Period: 1990–present

Louis de Bernières (born 8 December 1954) is an English novelist. He is known for his 1994 historical war novel Captain Corelli's Mandolin. In 1993 de Bernières was selected as one of the "20 Best of Young British Novelists", part of a promotion in Granta magazine. Captain Corelli's Mandolin was published in the following year, winning the Commonwealth Writers Prize for Best Book. It was also shortlisted for the 1994 Sunday Express Book of the Year. It has been translated into at least 11 languages and is an international best-seller.

He was elected a Fellow of the Royal Society of Literature in 2006. In 2008, he was awarded an honorary doctorate by De Montfort University in Leicester, which he had attended when it was Leicester Polytechnic.

Politically, he identifies himself as Eurosceptic and has voiced his support for the United Kingdom's exit from the European Union.

== Biography ==
Louis H. P. de Bernières-Smart was born near Woolwich in London in 1954 and grew up in Surrey. The name de Bernières is inherited from a French Huguenot ancestor. He was educated at Grenham House school—where he reported the pupils were subjected to "hellish abuse"—and at Bradfield College, and joined the army when he was 18, but left after four months of the officer training course at Sandhurst. He next attended the Victoria University of Manchester and the Institute of Education, University of London. Before he began to write full-time he held a wide variety of jobs, including being a mechanic, a motorcycle messenger and an English teacher in Colombia. As of 2008 he lived near Bungay in Suffolk.

In 2009 he separated from his partner, actress Cathy Gill, who took custody of their children, Robin and Sophie. Eventually, he gained equal custodial rights. He has never remarried.

De Bernières is an avid musician. He plays flute, mandolin, clarinet and guitar, although he considers himself an "enthusiastic but badly-educated and erratic" amateur. His literary work often references music and the composers he admires, such as the guitar works of Villa-Lobos and Antonio Lauro in the Latin American trilogy, and the mandolin works of Vivaldi and Hummel in Captain Corelli's Mandolin. He has dystonia, which affects his playing.

== Books ==
=== Latin American trilogy ===
According to de Bernières, his experiences in Colombia, and the influence of writer Gabriel García Márquez—he describes himself as a "Márquez parasite"—profoundly influenced his first three novels, The War of Don Emmanuel's Nether Parts (1990), Señor Vivo and the Coca Lord (1991) and The Troublesome Offspring of Cardinal Guzman (1992).

=== Captain Corelli's Mandolin ===
De Bernières' most famous book is his fourth, Captain Corelli's Mandolin, in which the eponymous hero is an Italian soldier who is part of the occupying force on the Greek island of Cephalonia during the Second World War. In the US it was originally published as Corelli's Mandolin.

In 2001, the book was turned into a film. De Bernières strongly disapproved of the film version, commenting, "It would be impossible for a parent to be happy about its baby's ears being put on backwards." He does however state that it has redeeming qualities, and particularly likes the soundtrack.

Since the release of the book and the movie, Cephalonia has become a major tourist destination, and the tourist industry on the island has begun to capitalise on the book's name. Of this, de Bernières said: "I was very displeased to see that a bar in Agia Efimia has abandoned its perfectly good Greek name and renamed itself Captain Corelli's, and I dread the idea that sooner or later there might be Captain Corelli Tours, or Pelagia Apartments."

=== Red Dog ===
His book Red Dog (2001) was inspired by a statue of a dog he saw during a visit to the Pilbara region of Western Australia. It was adapted as a film of the same name in Australia in 2011.

=== Birds Without Wings ===
Birds Without Wings (2004) is set in Turkey, and portrays the tragic fate of the diverse people in a small village, who belong to different language-speaking groups and religions, towards the end of the Ottoman Empire, the rise of Kemal Atatürk, and the Gallipoli Campaign of the First World War from the Turkish viewpoint. The book was shortlisted for the 2004 Whitbread Novel Award and the 2005 Commonwealth Writers Prize (Eurasia Region, Best Book).

=== A Partisan's Daughter ===
A Partisan's Daughter (2008) tells of the relationship between a young Yugoslavian woman and a middle-aged British man in the 1970s, set in London.

=== Notwithstanding ===
Notwithstanding (2009) is a collection of short stories revolving around a fictional English village, Notwithstanding, and its eccentric inhabitants. Many of the stories were published separately earlier in de Bernières's career. Notwithstanding is based on the village of Hambledon in Surrey where he grew up, and he muses whether this is, or is no longer, the rural idyll. Some of the stories are autobiographical, such as "Silly Bugger 1" about a boy who brings up an abandoned rook, which becomes his companion, the rook sitting on his shoulder as he goes about his life – de Bernières is pictured on his website with a rook sitting on his shoulder. Notwithstanding is rich in local detail, containing references to the nearby villages and towns of Godalming, Chiddingfold, and Haslemere, as well as to Waitrose, Scats, the Institute of Oceanographic Sciences, the Merry Harriers pub and the "suicidal driving" of the nuns at St Dominic's School. De Bernières reflects in the Afterword:

"I realised that I had set so many of my novels and stories abroad, because custom had prevented me from seeing how exotic my own country is. Britain really is an immense lunatic asylum. That is one of the things that distinguishes us among the nations... We are rigid and formal in some ways, but we believe in the right to eccentricity, as long as the eccentricities are large enough... Woe betide you if you hold your knife incorrectly, but good luck to you if you wear a loincloth and live up a tree.

=== Blue Dog ===
The movie Red Dog: True Blue (2016) is adapted from a screenplay by Daniel Taplitz. In this prequel to the Red Dog, a boy named Mick is sent to the outback to live with his Granpa after a tragedy befalls him, it looks as if he has a lonely life but while exploring the floodwaters, he finds a lost puppy covered in mud and half-drowned. Mick and his dog immediately become inseparable as they take on the adventures offered by their unusual home, and the business of growing up, together. Louis de Bernières tells the story of a young boy and his Granpa, and the charismatic and entertaining dog.

=== The Daniel Pitt Trilogy ===
The Daniel Pitt Trilogy, comprising the three novels The Dust that Falls from Dreams (2015), So Much Life Left Over (2018), and The Autumn of the Ace (2020), follows the life of its central character Daniel Pitt, a flying ace in WWI, and the McCosh family through the 20th century. The story was strongly inspired by de Bernières' own grandfather's life.

== Bibliography ==
=== Novels ===
- The War of Don Emmanuel's Nether Parts (1990)
- Señor Vivo and the Coca Lord (1991)
- The Troublesome Offspring of Cardinal Guzman (1992)
- Captain Corelli's Mandolin (1994), originally published as Corelli's Mandolin in the US
- Red Dog (2001)
- Birds Without Wings (2004)
- A Partisan's Daughter (2008)
- The Dust that Falls From Dreams (2015)
- Blue Dog (2016)
- So Much Life Left Over (2018)
- The Autumn of the Ace (2020)
- Light Over Liskeard (2023)

=== Short story collections ===
- Notwithstanding: Stories from an English Village (2009)
- Labels and Other Stories (2019)

=== Plays ===
- Sunday Morning at the Centre of the World (2001)

=== Poetry ===
- A Walberswick Goodnight Story (2006)
- Imagining Alexandria (2013)
- Of Love and Desire (2016)
- The Cat in The Treble Clef (2018)

=== Non fiction ===
- The Book of Job: An Introduction (1998)
