= Pınarcık, Milas =

Village in Milas, Muğla, Turkey

Coordinates: 37°27′07″N 27°30′24″E

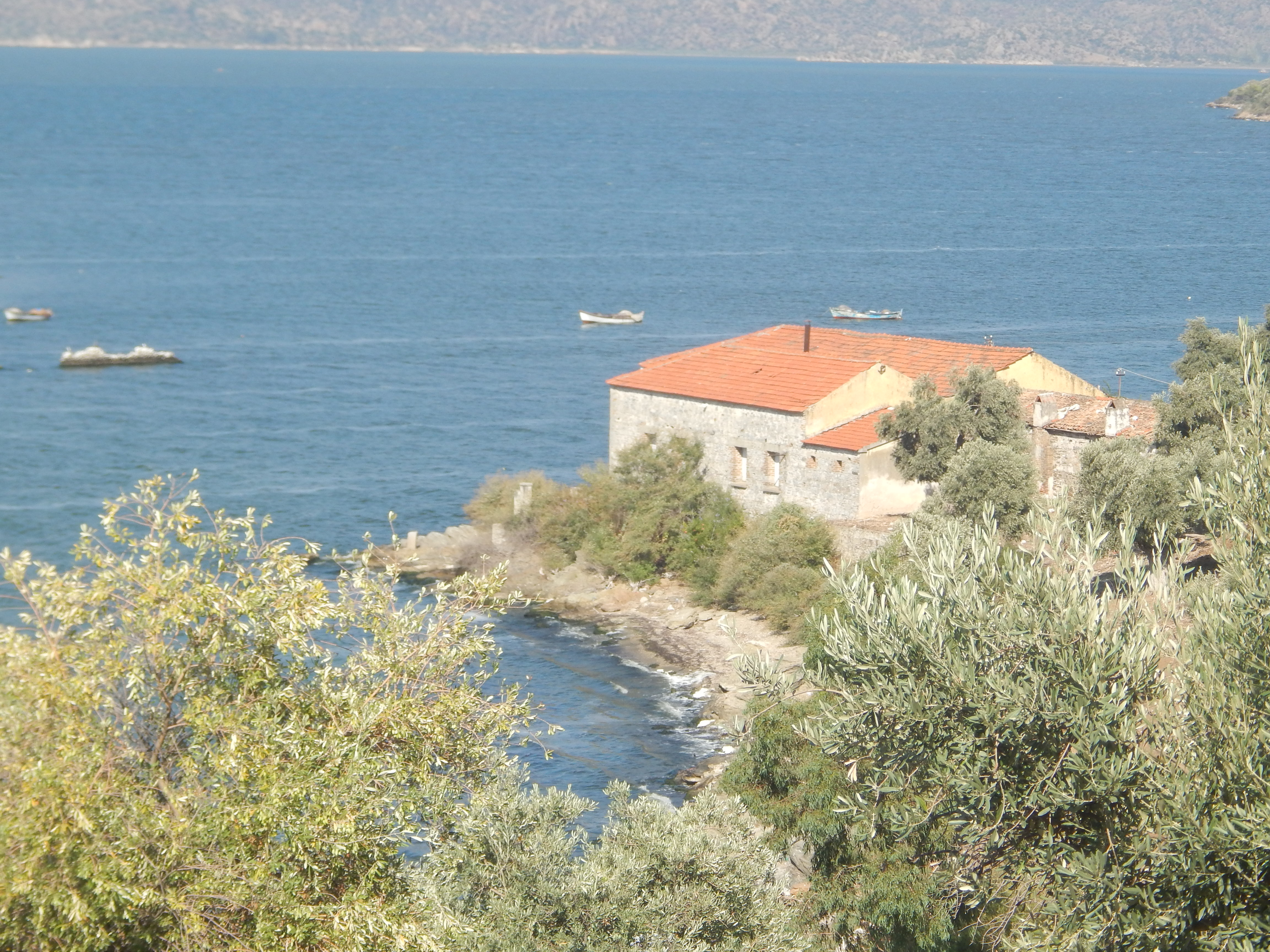
Pınarcık-Milas-Muğla, Turkey - panoramio

Pınarcık is a neighbourhood of Milas in Turkey.
