= List of ships named Hercules =

Hercules was the name of a large number of ships, named in honour of the Roman mythological hero Hercules:

- Hercules (1771 ship) was launched at Georgia in 1771. She appeared in Lloyd's Register in 1777 and became a West Indiaman. Between 1792 and 1796 she made three voyages as a whaler in the Southern Whale Fishery. In 1797 the French captured Hercules as she was on her fourth voyage.
- Hercules (1777 ship) was launched at the Province of Georgia. She appeared in Lloyd's Register in 1782 as a West Indiaman. From 1786 she made three voyages as a slave ship. She was lost as she was returning to England after having delivered her slaves at Jamaica.
- Hercules (1792 ship), of 600 or 628 tons (bm), was an American ship built in New England that was lost off the Cape of Good Hope in 1797 while bringing rice from Bengal to England.
- Hercules (1801 ship) was built at South Shields, England. She made one trip transporting convicts to Port Jackson. She made two trips for the British East India Company (EIC), and was homeward bound from the second of these when the French privateer Napoleon captured her off the Cape of Good Hope.
- Hercules (1796 ship) was launched at Bristol in 1796. She was a West Indiaman. In 1814 an American privateer captured her and a British naval vessel recaptured her. Because the recapture occurred after 1 March 1815, she was returned to the United States.
- Another ship named Hercules built at South Shields in 1801 was bought by the Royal Navy in 1803, becoming HMS Merlin
- Hercules (1812 ship) was apparently an American ship in origin. She made two voyages as a whaler in the Southern Whale Fishery and then was no longer listed in 1818.
- Hercules (1814 ship) was built at Calcutta. She acquired British registry and traded between Britain and India under a license from the British EIC before returning to Calcutta registry. She then traded opium between India and China, and became an opium receiving ship for Jardine Matheson. In 1839 she was one of the vessels that surrendered her store of opium to be burned at the behest of Chinese officials at Canton. This incident was one of the proximate causes of the First Opium War (1839–1842). Her owners apparently sold her to American owners in 1839.
- Hercules (1822 ship) was a sailing ship built in 1822 at Whitby, England, that made three voyages transporting convicts to Australia and two voyages for the British East India Company
- Hercules (1907), a steam tug now preserved in San Francisco, California
- Hercules (1973 ship), a Liberian-flagged tanker attacked by Argentine forces during the Falklands War.

== See also ==
- ARA Hércules
- Hercules (Swedish ship)
- HMS Hercules, any of several ships of the Royal Navy
- Spanish ship Hercules
- PS Hercules, a paddle steamer launched in 1838
- SS Hercules, any of several steamships
- USS Hercules
- French ship Hercule
- Dutch ship Hercules
