= USS Hercules =

Five ships of the United States Navy have borne the name USS Hercules, after Hercules, the Roman name version of Heracles. Hercules also is the name of a constellation.

- USS Hercules (1869) was a monitor ironclad steamer, originally named Quinsigamond, she was rechristened Hercules from 15 June to 10 August 1869, and then to Oregon
- USS Hercules (YT-13) was a tugboat, purchased by the US Navy in April 1889 for use in the Spanish–American War and sold in 1937
- USS Hercules (YE-30) was a lighter purchased by the US Navy in 1918 and sold in 1923
- USS Hercules (AK-41) was acquired by the US Navy in 1941 and transferred to the Maritime Commission in July 1946
- USS Hercules (PHM-2) was a Pegasus-class hydrofoil, commissioned in 1982 and sold in 1996

== See also ==
- Hercules (ship), other ships with name Hercules
