= Spanish ship Hercules =

Several ships of the Spanish Navy have borne the name Hercules:

- Hercules (1716), a 50-gun ship, stricken in 1718.
- Hercules (1719), a 60-gun ship, broken up in 1746.
- Hercules (1756), a 70-gun ship, removed from Navy lists in 1759.
- Hercules (1819), a 20-gun ship.

== See also ==
- Hercules (ship), other ships with name Hercules
