= SS Hercules =

Hercules was the name of a large number of steamships.

- SS Hercules (1835), built for the Chester and Holyhead railway, later acquired by the London and North Western Railway.
- SS Hercules (1888), built for Dampfschiffahrts-Gesellschaft Neptun, Bremen. In service 1888–89
- SS Hercules (1903), built for Dampfschiffahrts-Gesellschaft Neptun. In service 1903–14
- SS Hercules (1910), built for the London Brighton and South Coast Railway as SS Brittany. Renamed Hercules in 1936
- SS Hercules (1929), built for Dampfschiffahrts-Gesellschaft Neptun. In service 1929–45.

For other ships named Hercules see the following entries on the Miramar website (subscription required). These may be sailing ships, steam ships or motor vessels.

- (1822–98), (1898–1911), (1911–76) and (1977 on)

== See also ==
- Hercules (ship), other ships named Hercules
