= French ship Hercule =

Nineteen ships of the French Navy have borne the name Hercule, in honour of the Roman hero Hercules:

- Hercule (1657–1673), a 38-gun ship of the line
- Soleil (1642–1672), a 36-gun ship of the line rename Hercule in 1671
- Hercule (1673–1678), a 50-gun ship of the line
- Hercule (1679–1704), a 30-gun ship of the line
- Hercule (1705–1741), a 64-gun ship of the line
- Hercule (1750–1760), a 66-gun ship of the line
- Hercule (1779), a fluyt
- Hercule (1779–1797), a 74-gun
- Hercule (1798–1798), a bomb vessel
- Hercule (1798), a Téméraire-class ship of the line
- Hercule (1800), a brig
- Hercule (1804–1815), a bomb vessel
- Provence (1815–1883), an 80-gun ship of the line, was renamed Hercule in 1815
- Hercule (1836–1860), a 100-gun ship of the line
- Hercule (1893–1944), a tugboat
- Hercule (1914–1918), an auxiliary minesweeper
- Hercule (1939–1944), an auxiliary tugboat of the FNFL
- Hercule (1945–1951), a tugboat
- Hercule (1960–1993), a tugboat

== See also ==
- Hercules (ship), other ships with name Hercules
