= Maczuga Herkulesa =

Limestone stack in Poland

Coordinates: 50°14′34.49″N 19°46′58.62″E

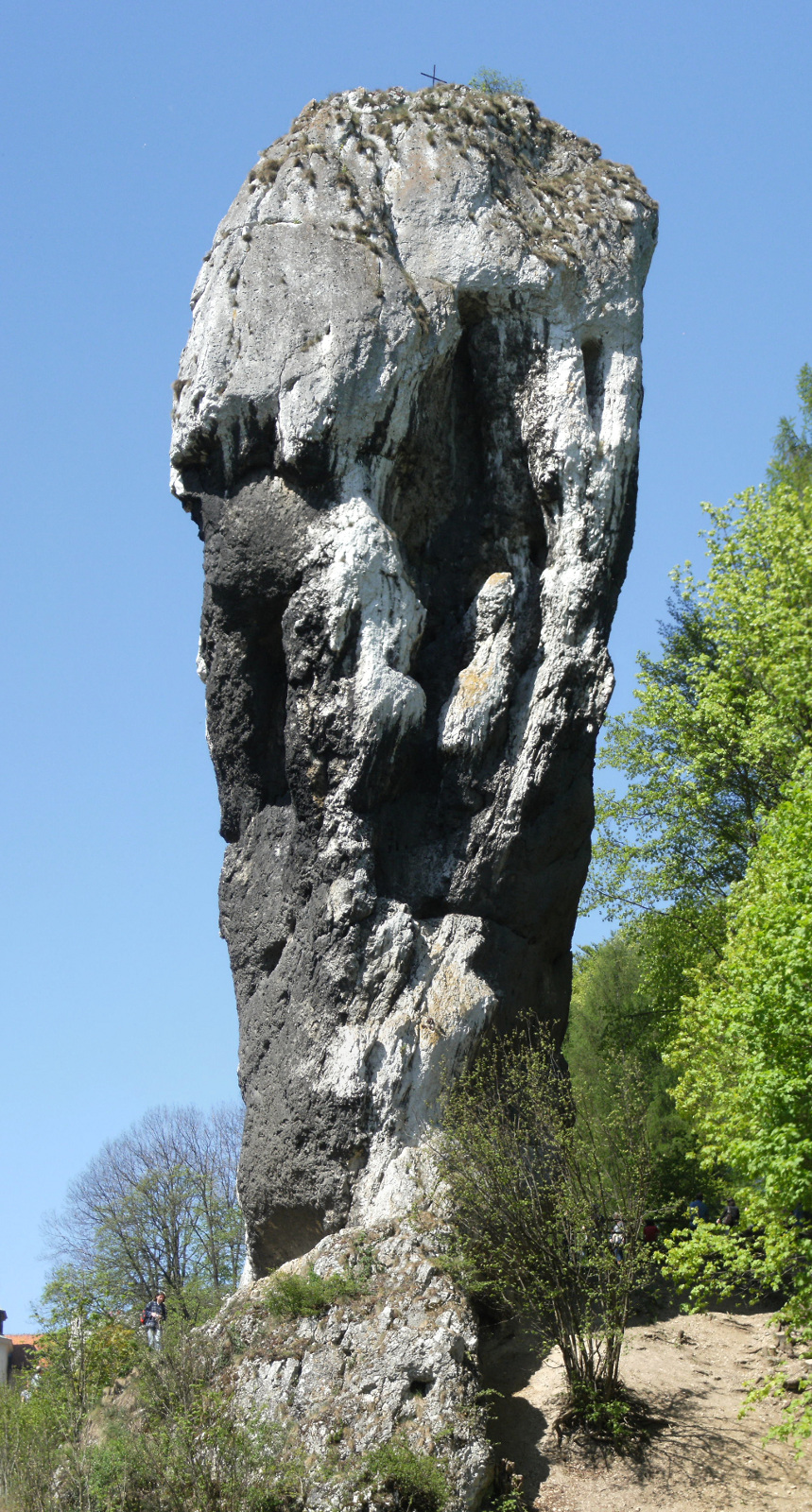
Maczuga Herkulesa

Maczuga Herkulesa is a tall (30 meters) limestone stack situated in Ojców National Park near Pieskowa Skała, north of Kraków in southern Poland. Its name, in Polish, means the "cudgel (or bludgeon) of Hercules", due to its distinctive shape.

Karst topography of soluble bedrock characterizes the entire park. The area is noted for its rock formations, although Maczuga Herkulesa may be the most famous. In addition to the limestone monadnocks, there are numerous cliffs and ravines as well as more than 400 caves in the area.
