= ARA Hércules =

Several ships of the Argentine Navy have been named ARA Hércules (or Hércules before the 1860s):

- Hércules (1814), a frigate that served as flagship of the second Argentine squadron during the Independence War
- Hércules (1859), a steamship that served in the war between Buenos Aires and the Argentine Confederation
- ARA Hércules (P-31), a frigate in Argentine service 1946–1973, ex USS Asheville (PF-1) and ex- HMS Adus
- ARA Hércules (B-52), a multipurpose transport in service as of 2015, previously a Type 42 destroyer (D-1) with the same name.

== See also ==
- Hercules (ship), other ships with name Hercules
