= Hercules (1812 ship) =

History

United Kingdom
- Name: Hercules
- Owner: 1812: Clarkson; 1814:J. Raines (or Reins, or Raine)
- Acquired: 1812 by purchase
- Fate: No longer listed in 1818

General characteristics
- Tons burthen: 284, or 285, or 288 (bm)
- Armament: 8 × 12-pounder carronades

Hercules first appeared in Lloyd's Register in 1812, with origin America. In 1813, she appeared in the Register of Shipping with origin Britain. She had undergone a repairs in 1812. She made two voyages as a whaler in the Southern Whale Fishery and then was no longer listed in 1818.

== Career ==
Although one source describes Hercules as a prize, she sailed under British colours well before the outbreak of the War of 1812.

She first appeared in Lloyd's Register (LR) in the volume for 1812, and in the Register of Shipping (RS) in the volume for 1813.

Year	Master	Owner	Trade	Source & notes
1812	Coleman	J.Raines	London–South Seas	LR; new keel & damages repaired 1812
1813	J.Coleman	Clarkson	London–South Seas	RS; new keel & damages repaired 1812

1st whaling voyage (1812–1814): Captain Simon Coleman sailed from London on 19 March 1812, bound for the South Seas. In late September, the "Hercules whaler" was at St Helena. Hercules returned to London on 31 March 1814. She again underwent a good repair in 1814.

In 1813, the British East India Company (EIC) had lost its monopoly on the trade between India and Britain. British ships were then free to sail to India or the Indian Ocean under a licence from the EIC. Hercules's owners applied for a licence to sail to certain ports in the East Indies under the provisions for whalers. They applied on 25 July 1814, and received the licence on 8 August.

Year	Master	Owner	Trade	Source & notes
1814	J.Coleman; U.Bunker	J.Raines	London–South Seas	lr; new keel & damages repaired 1812, and good repair 1814

2nd whaling voyage (1814–1817): Captain U. Bunker sailed from London on 26 July 1814, bound for Timor. On 9 November 1816, Hercules, Bunker, master, was at the Cape of Good Hope, having come from Timor and Madagascar. She returned to Gravesend, Kent on 9 February 1817.

The registers did not publish in 1817 and Hercules did not appear in the registers for 1818.
