= Hercules =

Roman adaptation of the Greek divine hero Heracles

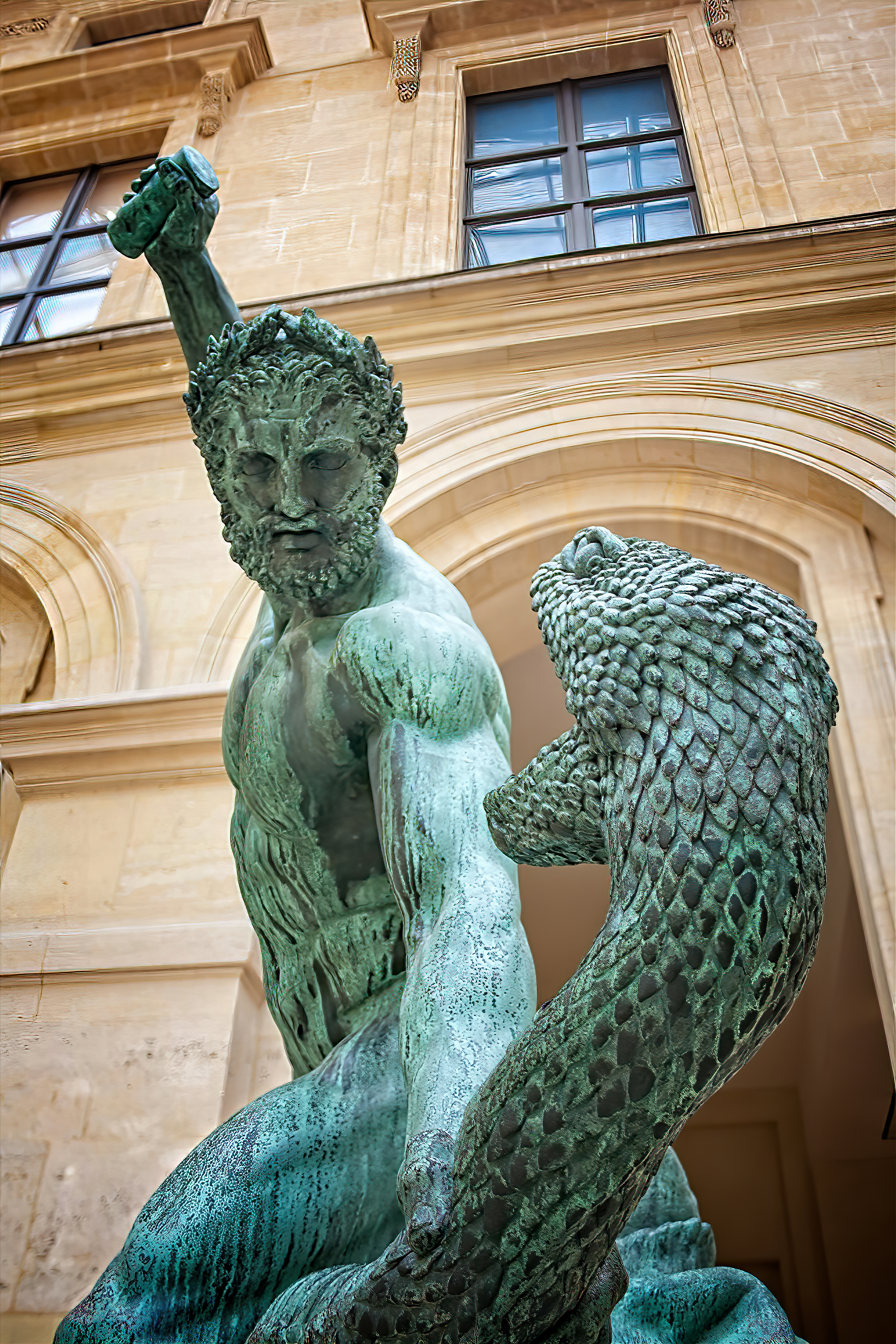
- Hercules battles Achelous, metamorphed into a serpent, 1824, by François Joseph Bosio. Louvre LL 325.
- Abode: Rome
- Symbol: Club, Nemean Lion, bow and arrows
- Parents: Jupiter and Alcmena

Equivalents
- Etruscan: Hercle
- Greek: Heracles
- Norse: Hercules Magusanus

Hercules (/ˈhɜːrkjʊˌliːz/, US: /-kjə-/) is the Roman equivalent of the Greek divine hero Heracles, son of Jupiter and the mortal Alcmena. In classical mythology, Hercules is famous for his superhuman strength and for his numerous far-ranging adventures.

The Romans adapted the Greek hero's iconography and myths for their literature and art under the name Hercules. In later Western art and literature and in popular culture, Hercules is more commonly used than Heracles as the name of the hero. Hercules is a multifaceted figure with contradictory characteristics, which enabled later artists and writers to pick and choose how to represent him.

== Mythology ==
=== Birth and early life ===
In Roman mythology, although Hercules was seen as the champion of the weak and a great protector, his personal problems started at birth. Juno sent two witches to prevent the birth, but they were tricked by one of Alcmene's servants and sent to another room. Juno then sent serpents to kill him in his cradle, but Hercules strangled them both. In one version of the myth, Alcmene abandoned her baby in the woods in order to protect him from Juno's wrath, but he was found by the goddess Minerva, who brought him to Juno, claiming he was an orphan child left in the woods who needed nourishment. Juno suckled Hercules at her own breast until the infant bit her nipple, at which point she pushed him away, spilling her milk across the night sky and so forming the Milky Way. She then gave the infant back to Minerva and told her to take care of the baby herself. In feeding the child from her own breast, the goddess inadvertently imbued him with further strength and power.

== Roman era ==
The Latin name Hercules was borrowed through Etruscan, where it is represented variously as Heracle, Hercle, and other forms. Hercules was a favorite subject for Etruscan art, and appears often on bronze mirrors. The Etruscan form Herceler derives from the Greek Heracles via syncope. A mild oath invoking Hercules (Hercule! or Mehercle!) was a common interjection in Classical Latin.

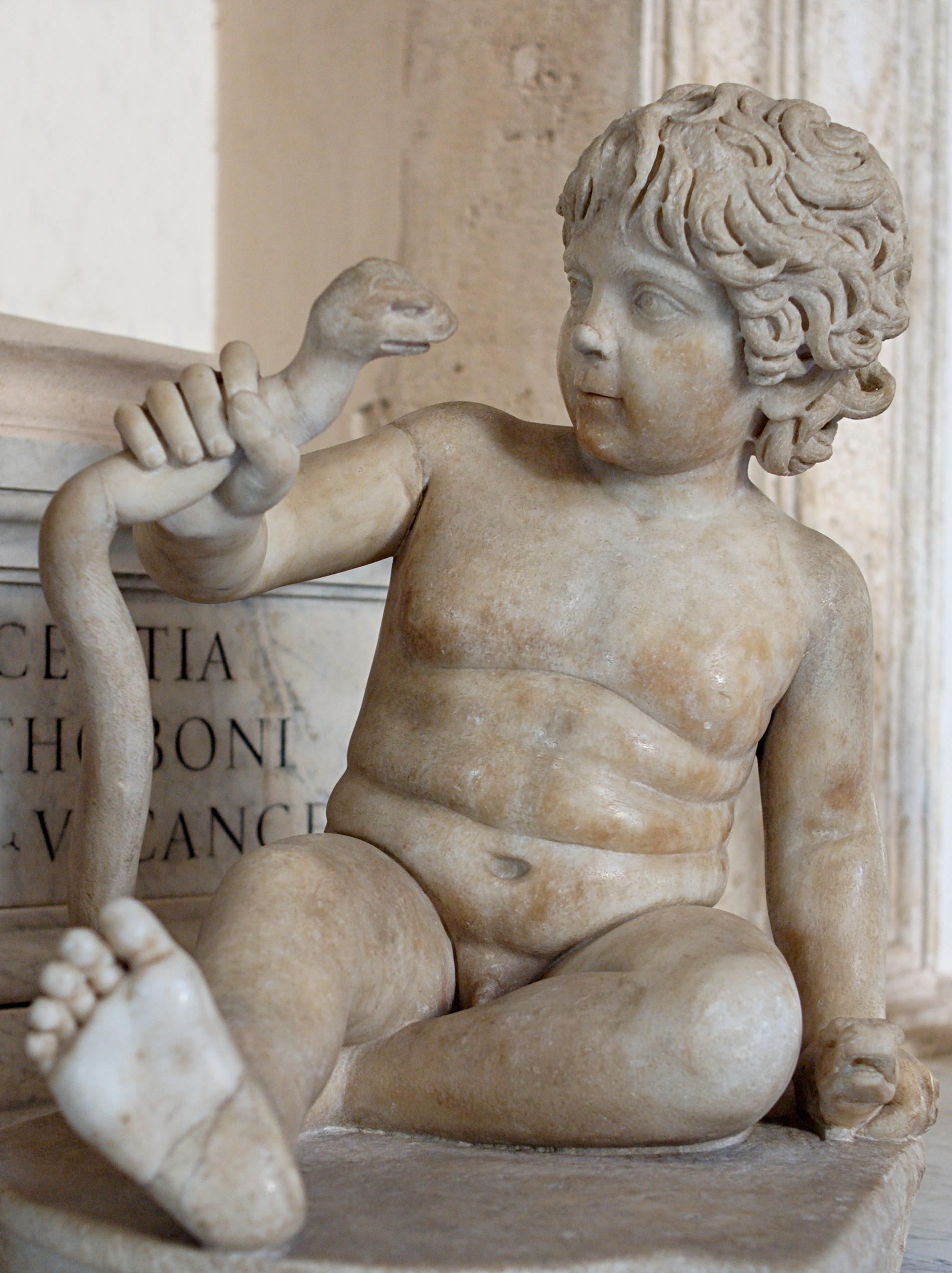
Baby Hercules strangling a snake sent to kill him in his cradle (Roman marble, 2nd century CE, in the Capitoline Museums of Rome, Italy).

Though not native to Italic religion, Hercules had become a popular god amongst various Italic cultures, primarily in the south and center of Italy. Dionysius of Halicarnassus, a 1st-century BCE Greek historian, testifies to the popularity of Hercules, stating that "one could scarcely find any place in Italy in which the god is not honored." Bronze statuettes dedicated to Hercules have been uncovered from sanctuaries throughout Samnium and the Apennines, with over a hundred such bronzes surfacing near a 3rd-century BCE sanctuary in Corfinium—a Paelignian territory. The popularity of these bronzes may have stemmed from the supposedly militaristic cultures of the Samnites and the Marsi and perhaps mercenaries serving under Hippocrates of Gela. However, the classicist Karl Galinsky suggests that these statuettes may instead continue an earlier "Mars" type, which also depicted a warrior figure.

Amongst the hundreds of known Sabellic votive statues of Hercules, a particularly common type—referred to as "Hercules in assault"—portrays a beardless Hercules posed in a manner akin to other warrior statuettes. Hercules is varyingly depicted with certain accompanying accoutrements—in some figurines he is portrayed wielding a club, whereas others depict the hero holding the apples of the Hesperides. Depictions specifically of Hercules are distinguished by the presence of a lion skin on the figure. The "Rorschach Hercules," a subtype of the aforementioned "Hercules in assault," portrays the lion skin as a geometric shape resemblant of an ink blot. According to Karl Galinsky, it is likely that the "Rorschach" style derives from local Italic artistic customs, in contrast to an alternative Hellenised style, in which the distinct muscles of the body were emphasised and the lion skin was depicted in a less abstract manner.

According to Macrobius, a 5th-century CE Roman historian, the earlier author Varro—who lived in the 1st-century BCE—had claimed the Hercules was the same as Mars. Confusion between the two deities may have resulted from the agrarian associations of both gods. In the Oscan Agnone tablet, Hercules is mentioned with the epithet Keriiúí, equivalent to Latin Cerealis, itself a reference to Ceres—the Roman goddess of agriculture. Certain places dedicated to Hercules across southern Italy may be associated with prominent agricultural and transhumance routes, such as in Alba Fucens, where a deity referred to as Hercules Salarius ("Hercules of Salt") was honored. According to the archaeologist Annalisa Marzano, the connection with salt may have itself related to the importance of salt in cheese production and food preservation, both of which are themselves vital for animal husbandry.

However, the archaeologist Tesse Stek notes that various sanctuaries of Hercules are not easily connectable with transhumance routes. For instance, a sanctuary of Hercules in Campochiaro is located 300 metres (980 ft) above the Boiano basin on the side of a mountain and is therefore—according to Stek—not easily accessible to any pastoralists. Stek further notes that the primary archaeological evidence for a relationship between Hercules and transhumance dates to the 2nd-century BCE—after Hercules had already become a prominent deity in Italic religions. It is perhaps possible that these 2nd-century BCE sites could preserve the functions of older religious sanctuaries, though Stek states that there is no "self-evident" justification for asserting such continuity. Likewise, the classicist Guy Bradley doubts the supposed pastoralist role of these sanctuaries, noting that these sanctuaries could easily have served the needs of any of the other traders, artisans, or travelers who utilised these roads, not exclusively farmers. Additionally, Bradley argues that the monumentalisation of these temples required a level of financial power that was likely unavailable to Samnite shepherds.

Hercules had a number of myths that were distinctly Roman. One of these is Hercules's defeat of Cacus, who was terrorising the countryside of Rome. The hero was associated with the Aventine Hill through his son Aventinus. Mark Antony considered him a personal patron god, as did the emperor Commodus. Hercules received various forms of religious veneration, including as a deity concerned with children and childbirth, in part because of myths about his precocious infancy, and in part because he fathered countless children. Roman brides wore a special belt tied with the "knot of Hercules", which was supposed to be hard to untie. The comic playwright Plautus presents the myth of Hercules's conception as a sex comedy in his play Amphitryon; Seneca wrote the tragedy Hercules Furens about his bout with madness. During the Roman Imperial era, Hercules was worshipped locally from Hispania through Gaul.

=== Germanic association ===
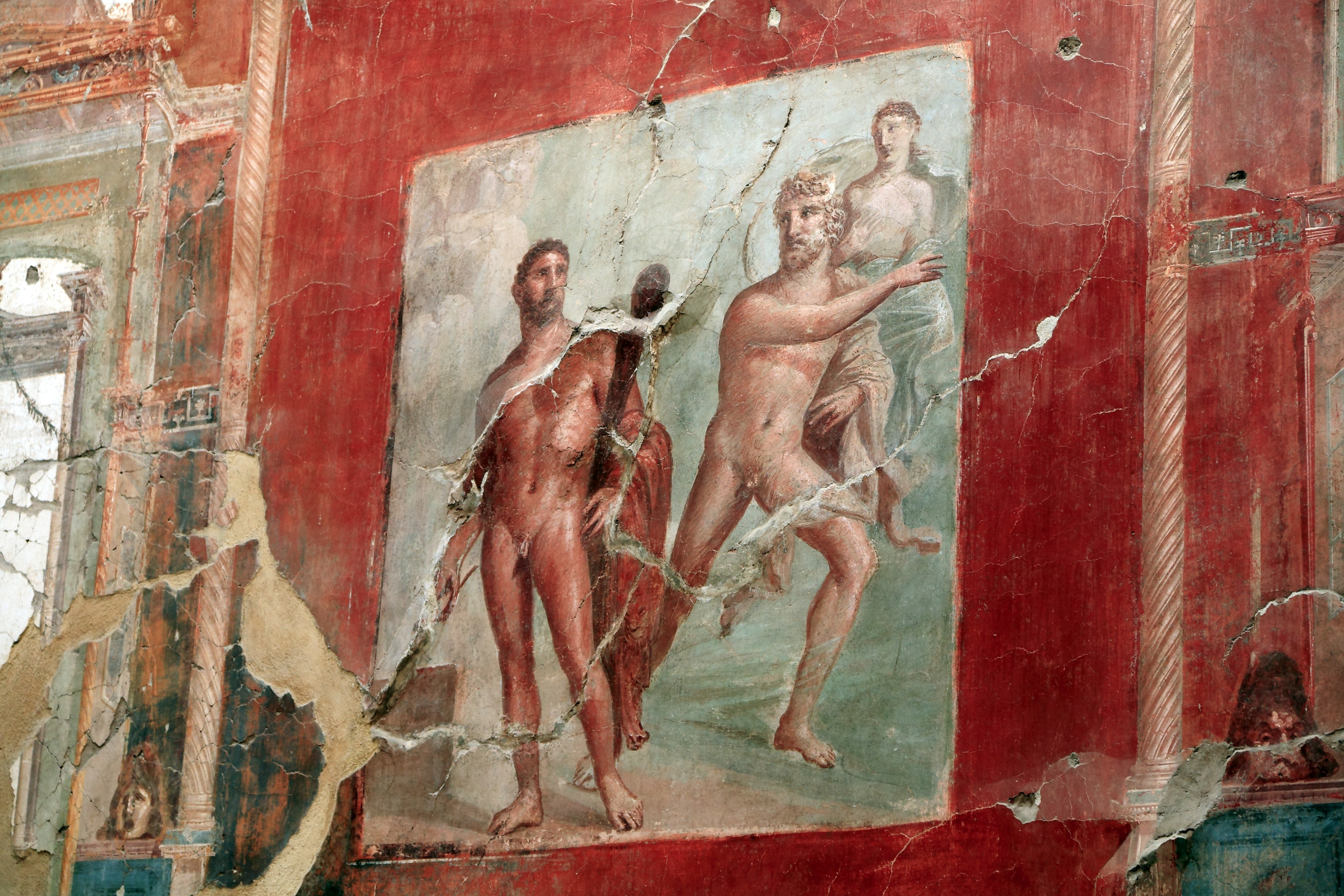
A fresco from Herculaneum depicting Heracles and Achelous from Greco-Roman mythology, 1st century CE.

Tacitus records a special affinity of the Germanic peoples for Hercules. In chapter 3 of his Germania, Tacitus states:

... they say that Hercules, too, once visited them; and when going into battle, they sang of him first of all heroes. They have also those songs of theirs, by the recital of this barditus as they call it, they rouse their courage, while from the note they augur the result of the approaching conflict. For, as their line shouts, they inspire or feel alarm.

Some have taken this as Tacitus equating the Germanic Þunraz with Hercules by way of interpretatio romana.

In the Roman era Hercules' Club amulets appear from the 2nd to 3rd century, distributed over the empire (including Roman Britain, cf. Cool 1986), mostly made of gold, shaped like wooden clubs. A specimen found in Köln-Nippes bears the inscription "DEO HER[culi]", confirming the association with Hercules.

In the 5th to 7th centuries, during the Migration Period, the amulet is theorised to have rapidly spread from the Elbe Germanic area across Europe. These Germanic "Donar's Clubs" were made from deer antler, bone or wood, more rarely also from bronze or precious metals. The amulet type is replaced by the Viking Age Thor's hammer pendants in the course of the Christianisation of Scandinavia from the 8th to 9th century.

== Late ancient and medieval mythography ==
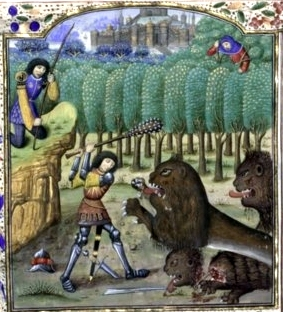
Hercules and the Nemean lion in the 15th-century Histoires de Troyes

After the Roman Empire became Christianised, mythological narratives were often reinterpreted as allegory, influenced by the philosophy of late antiquity. In the 4th century, Servius had described Hercules's return from the underworld as representing his ability to overcome earthly desires and vices, or the earth itself as a consumer of bodies. In some early patristic texts, Hercules was identified with the biblical figure Samson.

In medieval mythography, Hercules was one of the heroes seen as a strong role model who demonstrated both valor and wisdom, while the monsters he battles were regarded as moral obstacles. One glossator noted that when Hercules became a constellation, he showed that strength was necessary to gain entrance to Heaven.

Medieval mythography was written almost entirely in Latin, and original Greek texts were little used as sources for Hercules's myths.

== Renaissance mythography ==
The Renaissance and the invention of the printing press brought a renewed interest in and publication of Greek literature. Renaissance mythography drew more extensively on the Greek tradition of Heracles, typically under the Romanized name Hercules, or the alternate name Alcides. In a chapter of his book Mythologiae (1567), the influential mythographer Natale Conti collected and summarised an extensive range of myths concerning the birth, adventures, and death of the hero under his Roman name Hercules. Conti begins his lengthy chapter on Hercules with an overview description that continues the moralising impulse of the Middle Ages:

Hercules, who subdued and destroyed monsters, bandits, and criminals, was justly famous and renowned for his great courage. His great and glorious reputation was worldwide, and so firmly entrenched that he'll always be remembered. In fact the ancients honored him with his own temples, altars, ceremonies, and priests. But it was his wisdom and great soul that earned those honors; noble blood, physical strength, and political power just aren't good enough.

This renewed interest in Hercules was party because Hercules was being thought of as a philosopher, and Renaissance humanists began to consider Hercules as the god of inspired eloquence, as well as being connected to the idea of logos.

It also became common for the figure of Heracles to become adopted for political reasons. In the Renaissance period, there was a massive explosion in the creation of gardens, and in particular citrus gardens became associated with Hercules, specifically his eleventh labour, where he had to steal the apples of the Hesperides. This associated was particularly exploited by the Medici family, who wanted to link their family with ideas of strength and power.

=== Gallic Hercules ===
The tradition of Hercules in Gaul (in the Celtic language of Gaul referred to as Ogmios) can at least be traced back to Lucian, who, in his short work Heracles describes some strange symbolism of Hercules unique to Gaul, in which Hercules is depicted as eloquent and aged (quite unlike his depiction by the Greeks). Echoes of the same idea were also seen in the works of Isocrates, Lucius Annaeus Cornutus and the De Beneficiis of Seneca the Younger. By the early 16th century, Hercules was depicted in the Allegoriae poeticae of Albericus Londoniensis as an astronomer and philosopher.

In 1498 Annius of Viterbo published a collection of fragments entitled De his quae praecesserunt inundationem terrarum including one fragment which he attributed to Xenophon which told the story of Hercules leaving Libya, travelling to Gaul and marrying Galatea, the daughter of a Gallic king and siring Galateus. This account was further embellished by Jean Lemaire de Belges in his Illustrations de Gaule et Singularitez de Troye, who included a direct line of ancestry from Galateus to the Carolingian dynasty, and by Geofroy Tory in his Champfleury who made Hercules not only the King of Gaul, but also a magician, astronomer, and founder of Paris. This caused Hercules to become a symbol of French pride. Jean le Blond used Lucian's Gallicization of Hercules to claim that the ancients (i.e.: classical Romans) had admitted that the 'Gallic tongue' (French language) was superior to their own.

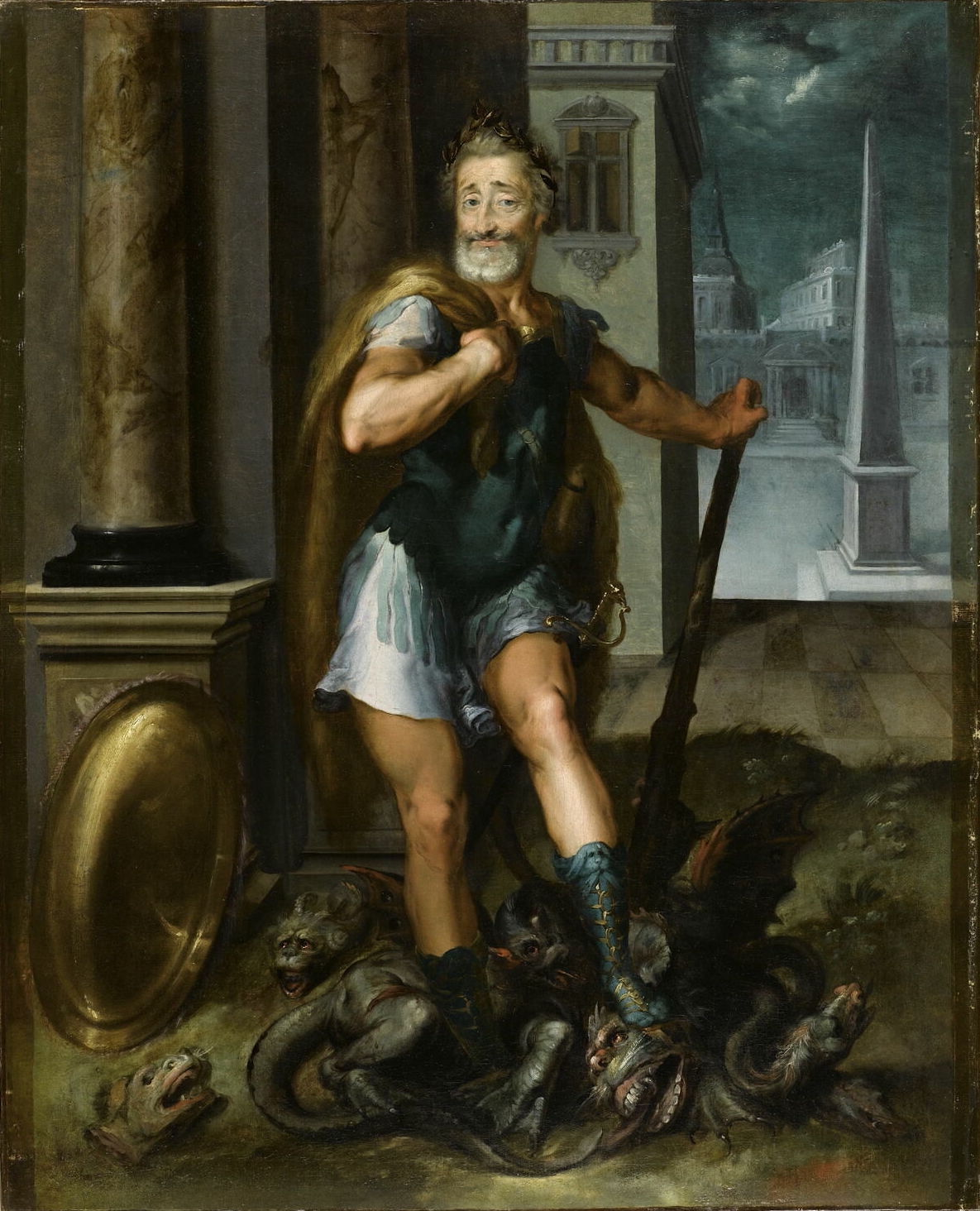
King Henry IV of France depicted as Hercules vanquishing the Lernaean Hydra (i.e. the Catholic League), by Toussaint Dubreuil, c. 1600

The association of Hercules with the French monarchy was particularly popular, as Gallic Hercules was seen as both a great orator and model prince. This association appears to have begun with François I, who had been portrayed as Hercules when Queen Eleanor of Austria entered Rouen. Mellin de Saint-Gelais also believed that the fashion of wearing a gold earring in François I's court was inspired by the Gallic Hercules myth, and Étienne Jodelle, writing a sonnet addressed to Henri III several years after François I's death, refers to François I as 'Hercule François'. When Henry II entered Paris on 16 June 1549, a statue of Gallic Hercules stood over Germain Boursier as he gave a speech which welcomed Henry II as the new Hercules, surpassing the Hercules of Libya. The likeness of the statue to François I indicated that it was François I in the guise of Hercules talking to his successor. Pierre de Ronsard wrote a hymn dedicated to Cardinal de Bourbon in which he compared the Cardinal's eloquence to that of Gallic Hercules'. In his Project de l'eloquence royale, composé pour Henri III, roi de France, Jacques Amyot reminds Henri III of 'our renowned Gallic Hercules', In 1600, the citizens of Avignon bestowed on Henry of Navarre (the future King Henry IV of France) the title of the Hercule Gaulois ("Gallic Hercules"), justifying the extravagant flattery with a genealogy that traced the origin of the House of Navarre to a nephew of Hercules's son Hispalus. Henry IV was particularly proud of his divine ancestry, and, according to his chancellor, Pomponne de Bellièvre, enjoyed surrounding himself with reminders of that. His son, Louis XIII, had Abraham Bosse depict him as Gallic Hercules in an etching, standing over a Spanish lion.

During Louis XIV's reign, the Gallic Hercules started to overshadow his Greek counterpart in terms of importance. This was particularly helped by Pierre Audigier's 1676 Origine des François et de leur empire, which, despite attacks from Pierre Bayle in his Dictionnaire Historique et Critique, would nonetheless cement the Gallic Hercules as more popular than the Greek Hercules. This is an association which had existed since at least Jean Lemaire, who referred to the Greek Hercules as the 'petit Hercule grec' in book 2 of his Illustrations de Gaule. Guillaume de Salluste Du Bartas went further, disassociating Hercules from his Greek and Roman myths by claiming that 'Gallic Hercules was not the bastard of Alcmene' in book 1 of his La Premiere sepmaine. The myth eventually became political doctrine, with Nicolas Fréret being imprisoned in the Bastille for four months in 1715 for making an address to the Royal Academy of Sciences in which he cast doubt on the mythological origins of the French monarchy. However, by the end of the Enlightenment, the idea had faded from popular imagination.

=== Hercules Polonus ===
Starting in the 17th century, the myth of Hercules started to be adopted by the Polish people in the figure of Hercules Polonus. This Polish Hercules was considered by later writers to be superior to the Greek Hercules, as the Greek Hercules was viewed as giving himself in to debauchery, whereas Hercules Polonus was not. The writer Seweryna Duchińska, whilst discussing a book by Philarète Chasles, also compares Hercules Polonus to the figure of 'Hercule Ogmius', the Gallic Hercules, describing him as an old man, without any of the iconography of his youth, such as the lion-skin and club. This commentary, published in a Polish-language paper in Paris, presented a comparison between the Polish and French states, which was more favourable to the Polish side.

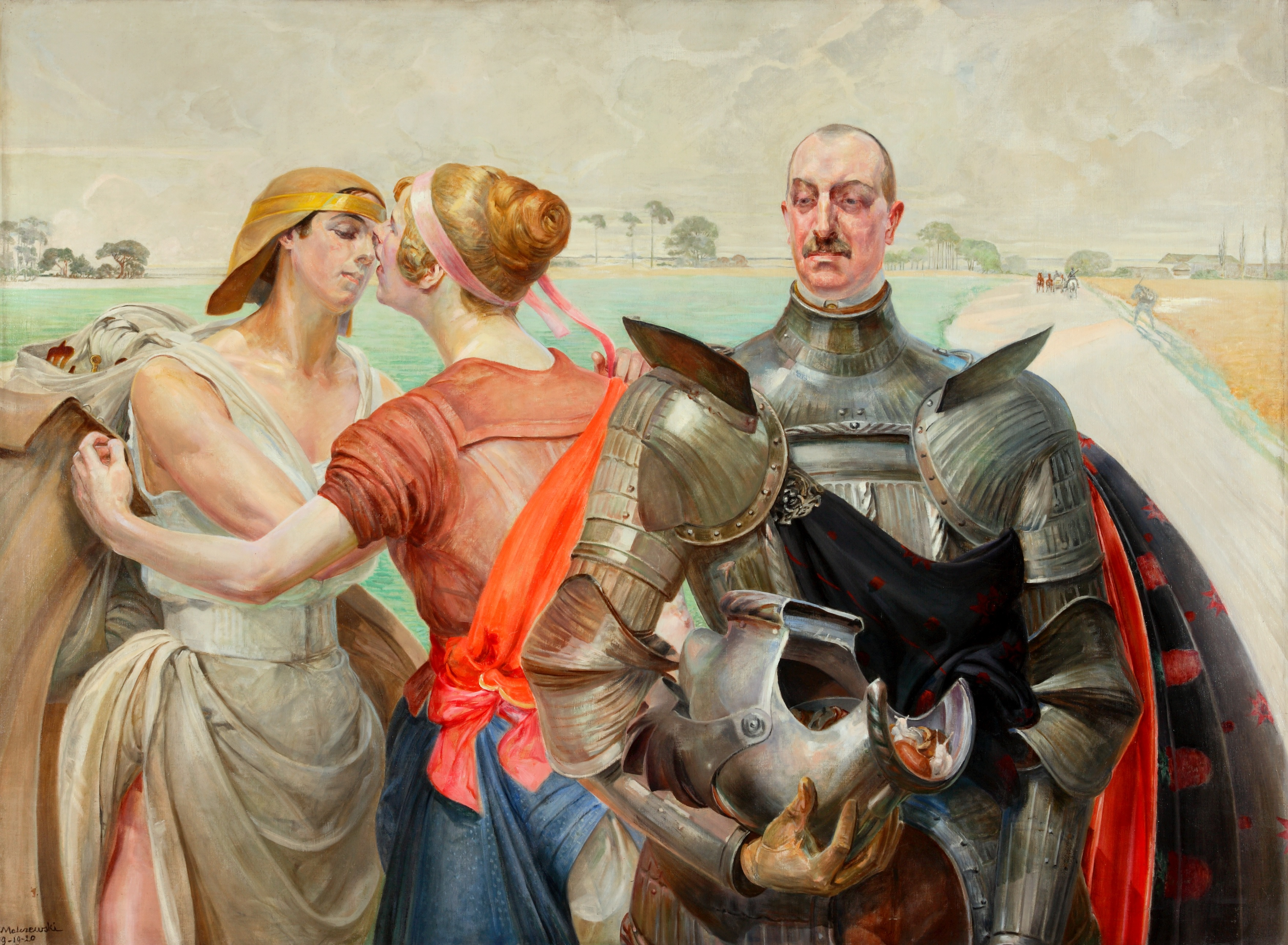
Polish aristocrat Aleksander Wielopolski depicted as Hercules at the crossroads, representing an allegory for Poland's future, by Jacek Malczewski

This association was first applied to Jan III Sobieski by his contemporaries, and during the building of Wilanów Palace had several statues commissioned in the likeness of Hercules. These statues were completed during the reign of his successor, Augustus II the Strong, who, as the Elector of Saxony was termed the Hercules Saxonicus, and a statue of Hercules in Wilanów Palace by Balthasar Permoser is named after this epithet. Although use of the association between Hercules and Poland started to fade away during the Partitions of Poland, it was revived by authors such as Henryk Sienkiewicz, Adam Mickiewicz, and Walery Łoziński who identified two other historical Poles with Hercules Polonus: Jeremi Wiśniowiecki and Kasper Miaskowski. Sienkiewicz continued to include references and allusion to Hercules within his works of Historical fiction, most notably in On the Field of Glory and The Deluge. This association was also taken up by Edward Tatham, whose work John Sobieski won the Lothian Prize Essay when he was studying at Brasenose College. Tatham associated the Polish and Jan Sobieski with Hercules through Juraj Jánošík, whom Tatham described as the founder of the House of Sobieski. Within Poland there is also a famous limestone stack named Maczuga Herkulesa, which is named for Hercules' club, which the stack bears a similarity to.

== Worship ==
=== Road of Hercules ===
The Road of Hercules is a route across Southern Gaul that is associated with the path Hercules took during his 10th labor of retrieving the Cattle of Geryon from the Red Isles. Hannibal took the same path on his march towards Italy and encouraged the belief that he was the second Hercules. Primary sources often make comparisons between Hercules and Hannibal. Hannibal further tried to invoke parallels between himself and Hercules by starting his march on Italy by visiting the shrine of Hercules at Gades. While crossing the alps, he performed labors in a heroic manner. A famous example was noted by Livy, when Hannibal fractured the side of a cliff that was blocking his march.

=== Worship from women ===
In ancient Roman society women were usually limited to two types of cults: those that addressed feminine matters such as childbirth, and cults that required virginal chastity. However, there is evidence suggesting there were female worshippers of Apollo, Mars, Jupiter, and Hercules. Some scholars believe that women were completely prohibited from any of Hercules's cults. Others believe it was only the "Ara Maxima" at which they were not allowed to worship. Macrobius in his first book of Saturnalia paraphrases from Varro: "For when Hercules was bringing the cattle of Geryon through Italy, a woman replied to the thirsty hero that she could not give him water because it was the day of the Goddess Women and it was unlawful for a man to taste what had been prepared for her. Hercules, therefore, when he was about to offer a sacrifice forbid the presence of women and ordered Potitius and Pinarius who were in charge of his rites, not to allow any women from taking part". Macrobius states that women were restricted in their participation in Hercules cults, but to what extent remains ambiguous. He mentions that women were not allowed to participate in Sacrum which is general term used to describe anything that was believed to have belonged to the gods. This could include anything from a precious item to a temple. Due to the general nature of a Sacrum, the extent of the prohibition can not judged from Macrobius alone. There are also ancient writings on this topic from Aulus Gellius when speaking on how Romans swore oaths. He mentioned that Roman women do not swear on Hercules, nor do Roman men swear on Castor. He went on to say that women refrain from sacrificing to Hercules. Propertius in his poem 4.9 also mentions similar information as Macrobius. This is evidence that he was also using Varro as a source.

=== Worship in myth ===
There is evidence of Hercules worship in myth in the Latin epic poem, the Aeneid. In the 8th book of the poem Aeneas finally reaches the future site of Rome, where he meets Evander and the Arcadians making sacrifices to Hercules on the banks of the Tiber river. They share a feast, and Evander tells the story of how Hercules defeated the monster Cacus, and describes him as a triumphant hero. Translated from the Latin text of Vergil, Evander stated: "Time brought to us in our time of need the aid and arrival of a god. For there came that mightiest avenger, the victor Hercules, proud with the slaughter and the spoils of threefold Geryon, and he drove the mighty bulls here, and the cattle filled both valley and riverside.

Hercules was also mentioned in the Fables of Gaius Julius Hyginus. For example, in his fable about Philoctetes he tells the story of how Philoctetes built a funeral pyre for Hercules so his body could be consumed and raised to immortality.

=== Hercules and the Roman triumph ===
According to Livy (9.44.16) Romans were commemorating military victories by building statues to Hercules as early as 305 BCE. Also, philosopher Pliny the Elder dates Hercules worship back to the time of Evander, by accrediting him with erecting a statue in the Forum Boarium of Hercules. Scholars agree that there would have been 5–7 temples in Augustan Rome. There are believed to be related Republican triumphatores, however, not necessarily triumphal dedications. There are two temples located in the Campus Martius. One, being the Temple of Hercules Musarum, dedicated between 187 and 179 BCE by M. Fulvius Nobilior. And the other being the Temple of Hercules Custos, likely renovated by Sulla in the 80s BCE.

=== In art ===
In Roman works of art and in Renaissance and post-Renaissance art, Hercules can be identified by his attributes, the lion skin and the gnarled club (his favorite weapon); in mosaic he is shown tanned bronze, a virile aspect.

In the twentieth century, the Farnese Hercules has inspired artists such as Jeff Koons, Matthew Darbyshire and Robert Mapplethorpe to reinterpret Hercules for new audiences. The choice of deliberately white materials by Koons and Darbyshire has been interpreted as perpetuation of colourism in how the classical world is viewed. Mapplethorpe's work with black model Derrick Cross can be seen as a reaction to Neo-classical colourism, resisting the portrayal of Hercules as white.

=== Roman era ===
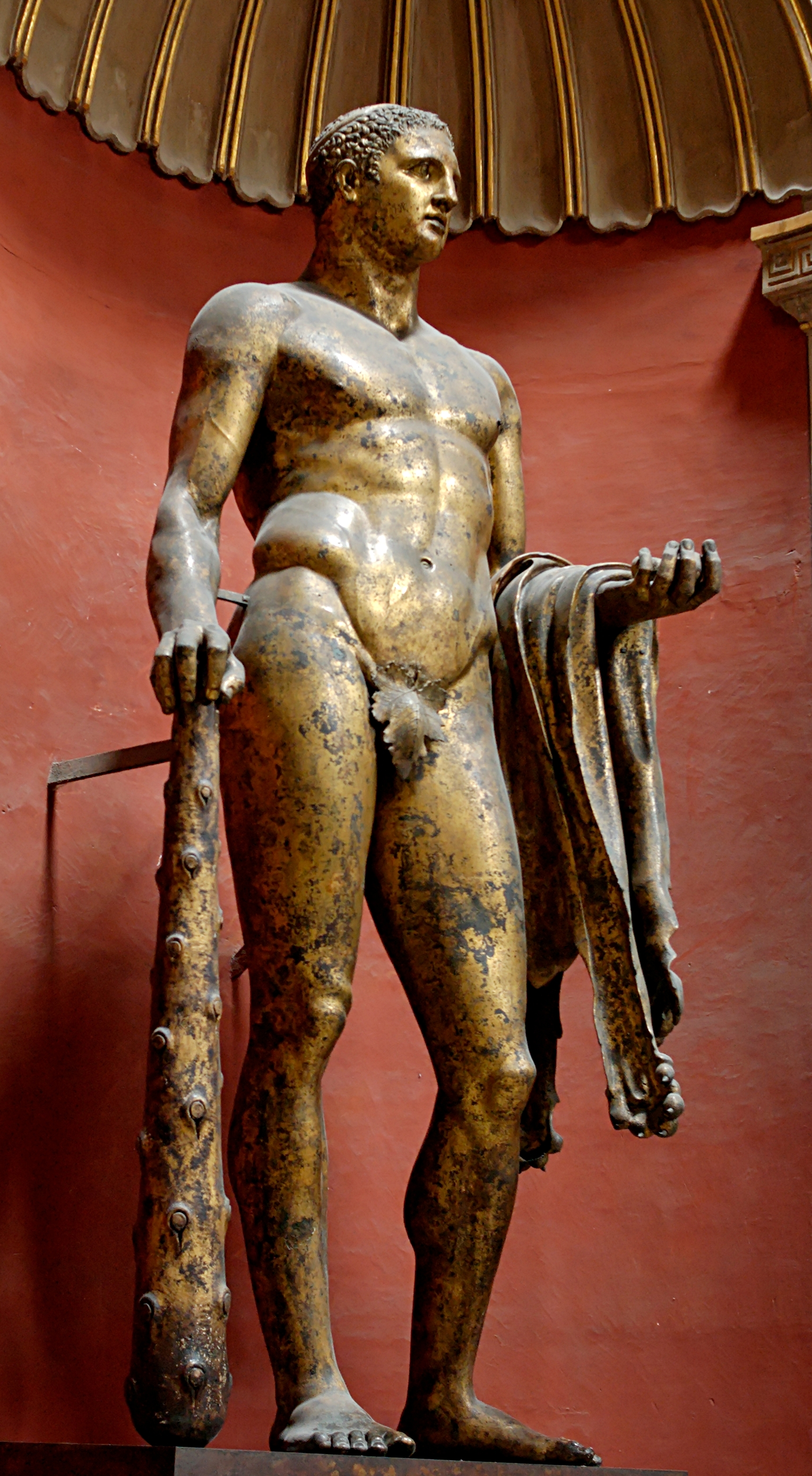
Hercules of the Forum Boarium (Hellenistic, 2nd century BCE)

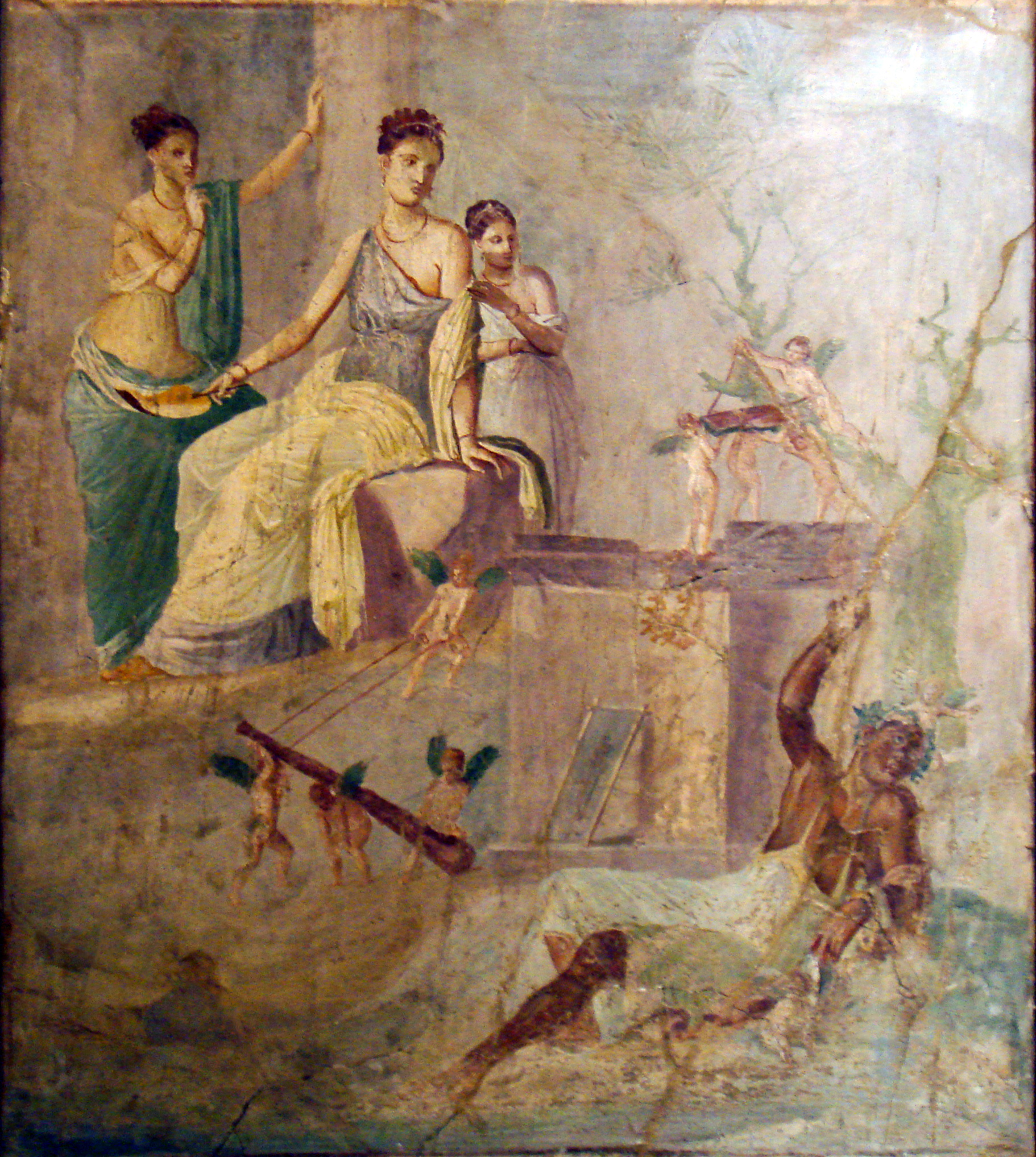
Hercules drunk and Omphale. Fresco from House of the Prince of Montenegro, Pompeii, 25–35 CE

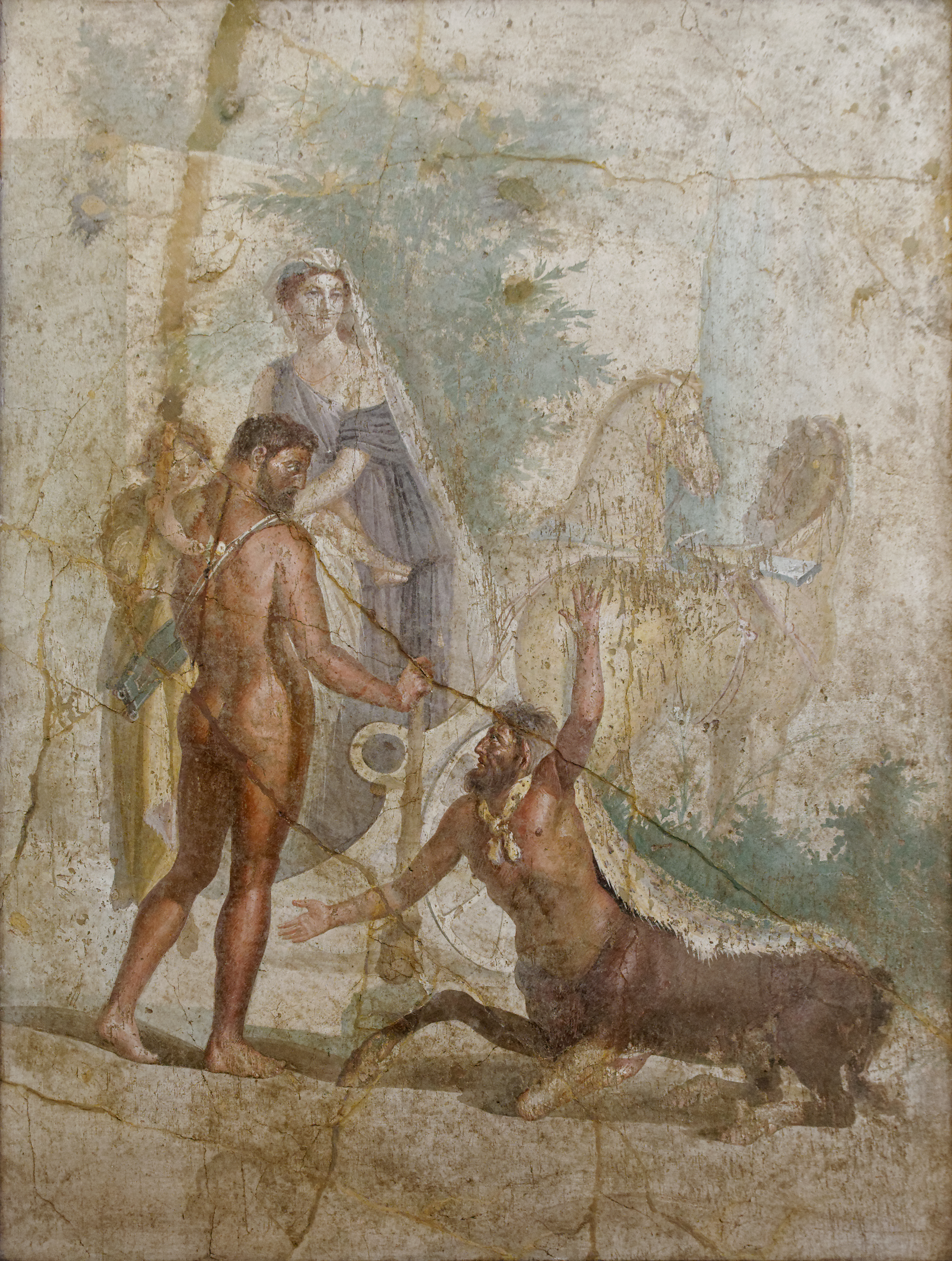
Hercules carrying his son Hyllus looks at the centaur Nessus, who is about to carry Deianira across the river on his back. Fresco from Pompeii, 30–45 CE

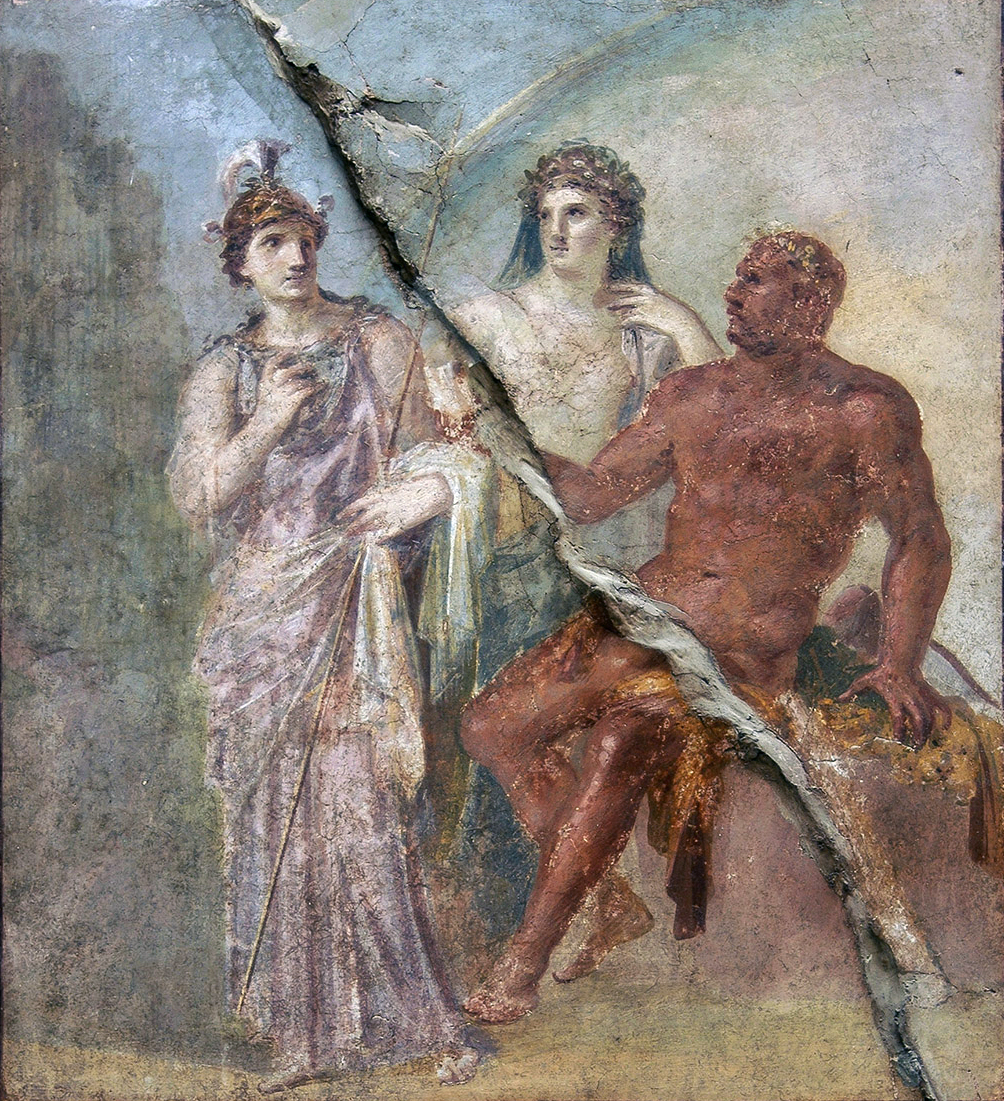
Hercules in Olympus with Juno and Minerva, fresco from Herculaneum, 1st century CE

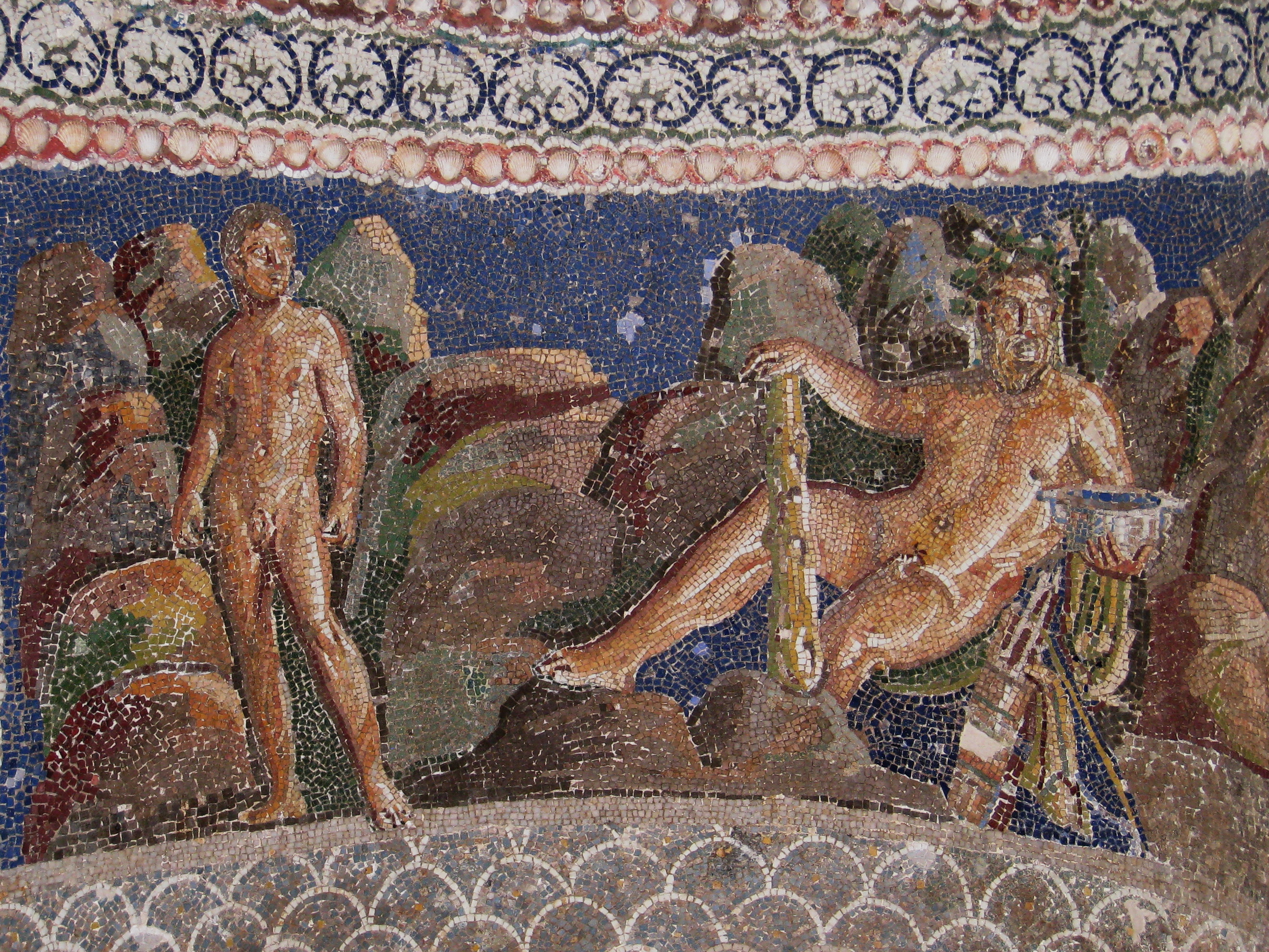
Hercules and Iolaus (1st century CE mosaic from the Anzio Nymphaeum, Rome)

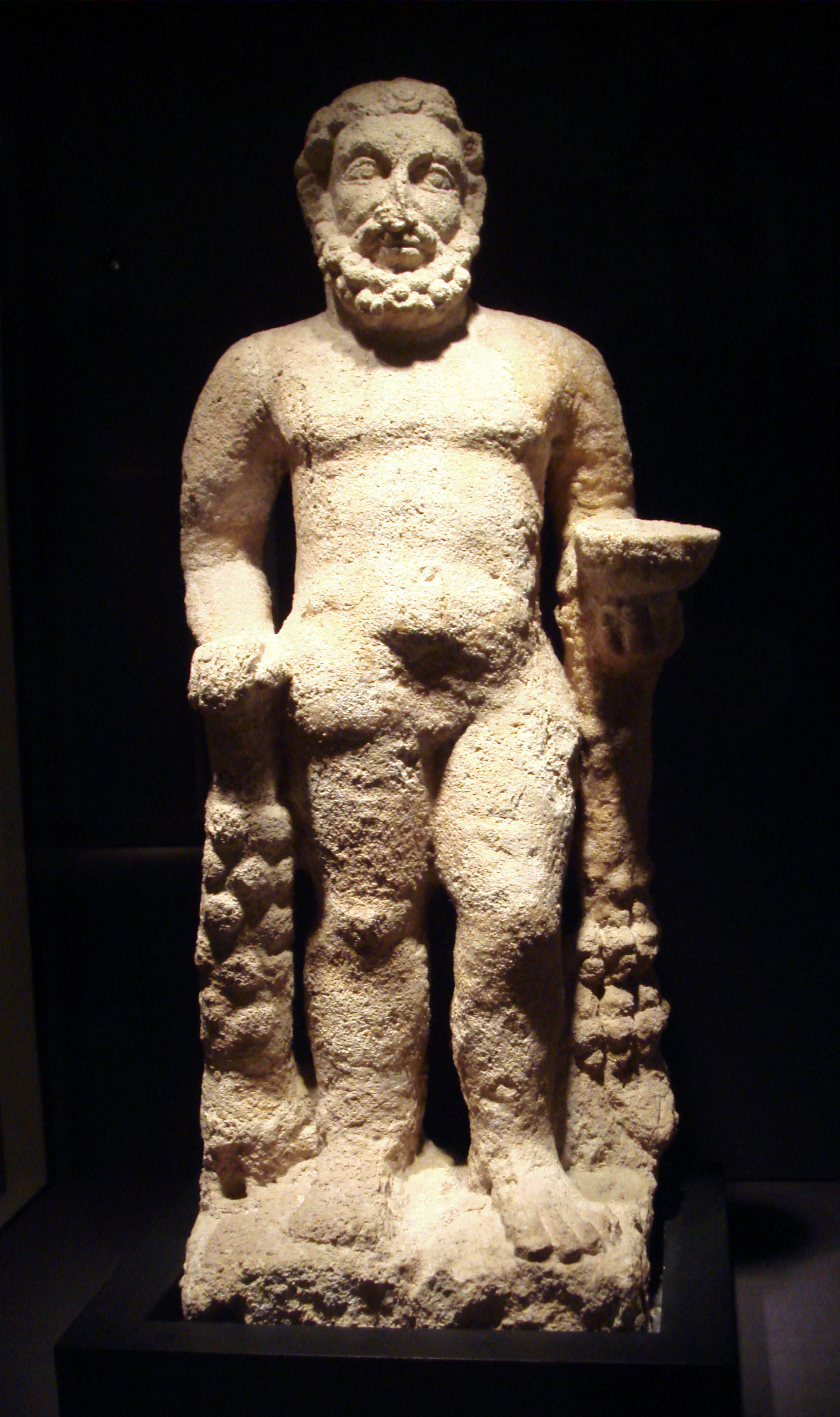
Hercules (Hatra, Iraq, Parthian period, 1st–2nd century CE)

Hercules bronze statuette, 2nd century CE (museum of Alanya, Turkey)

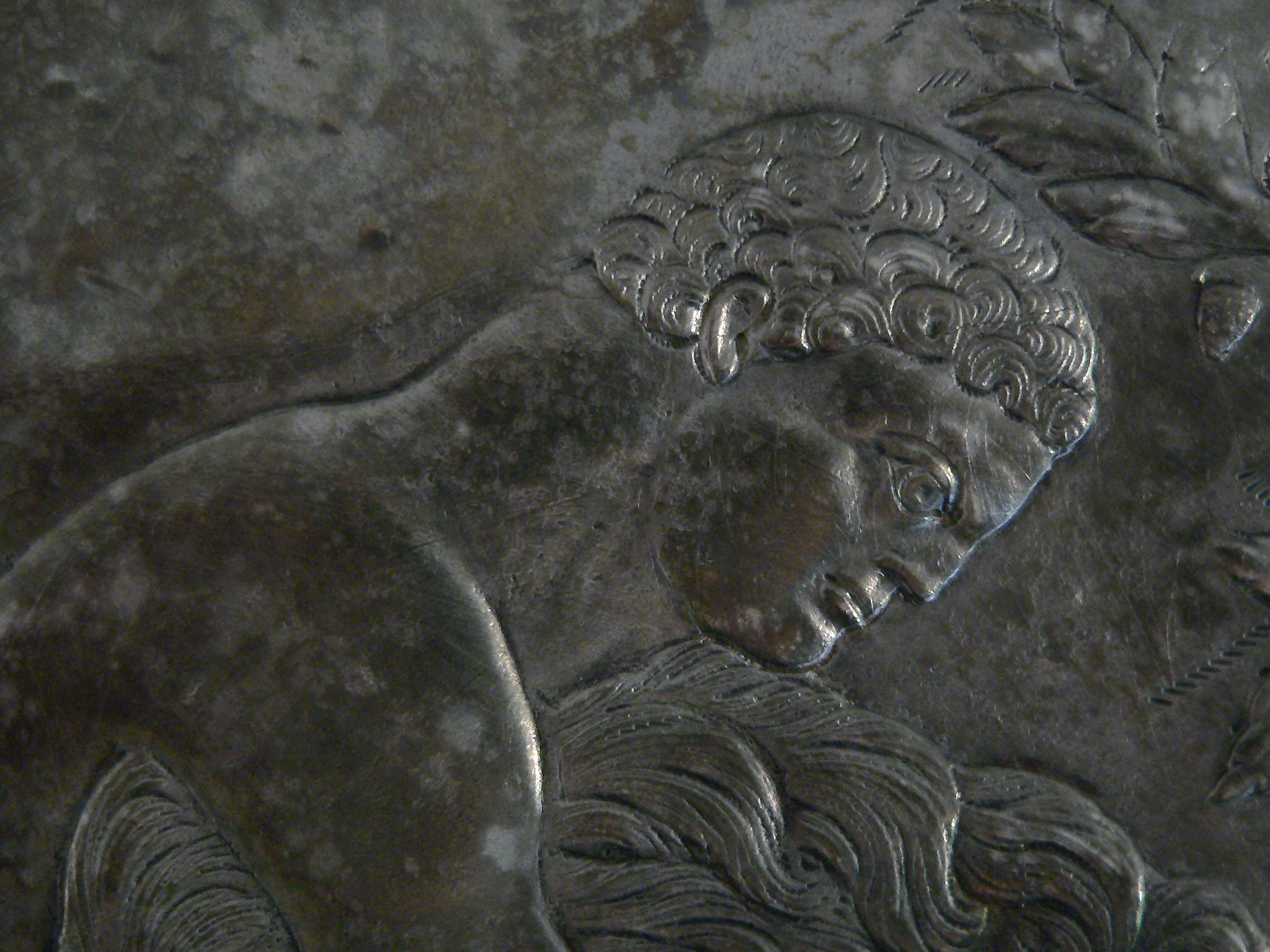
Hercules and the Nemean Lion (detail), silver plate, 6th century (Cabinet des Médailles, Paris)

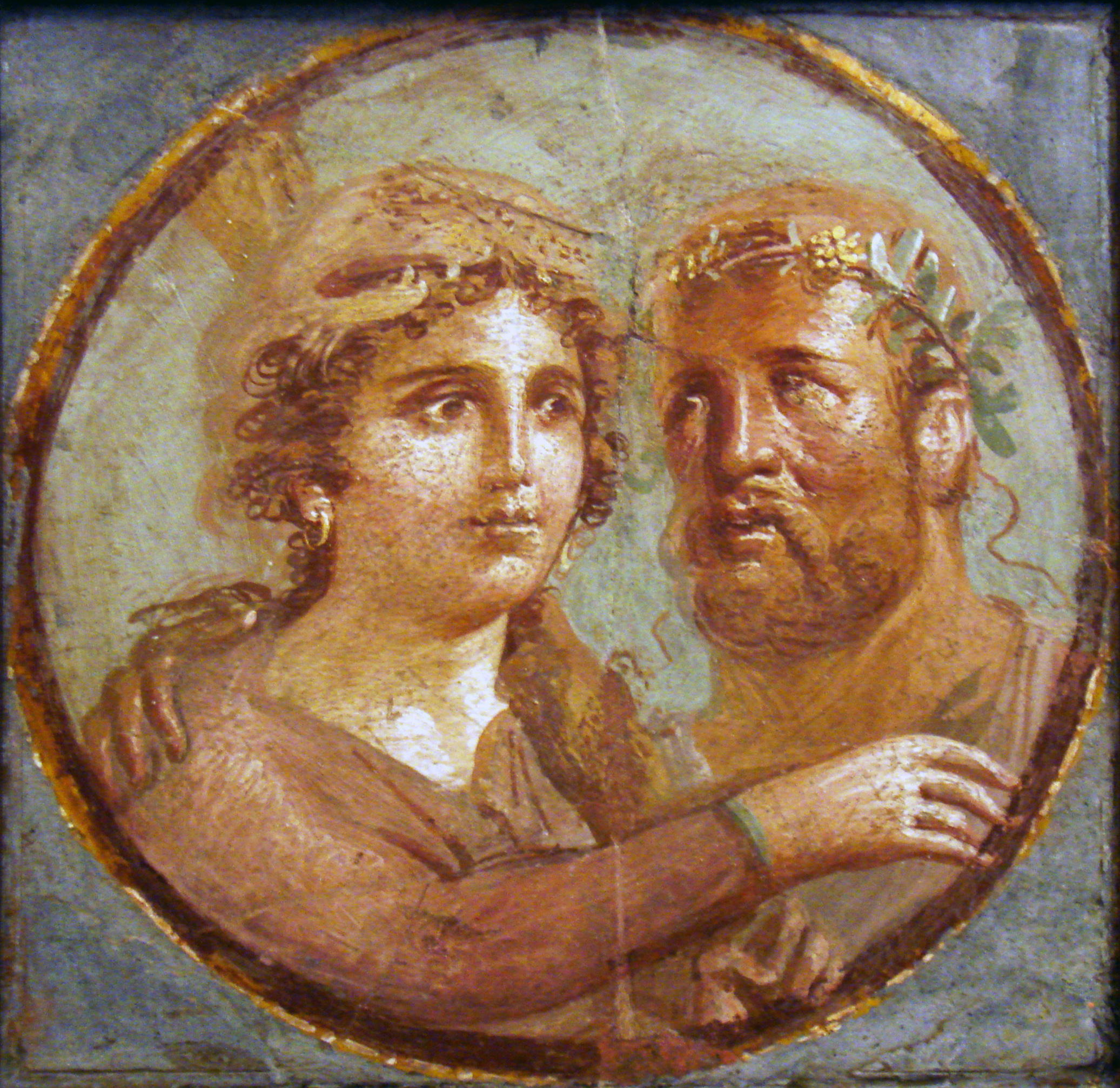
Heracles and Omphale, Roman fresco, Pompeian Fourth Style (45–79 CE), Naples National Archaeological Museum, Italy

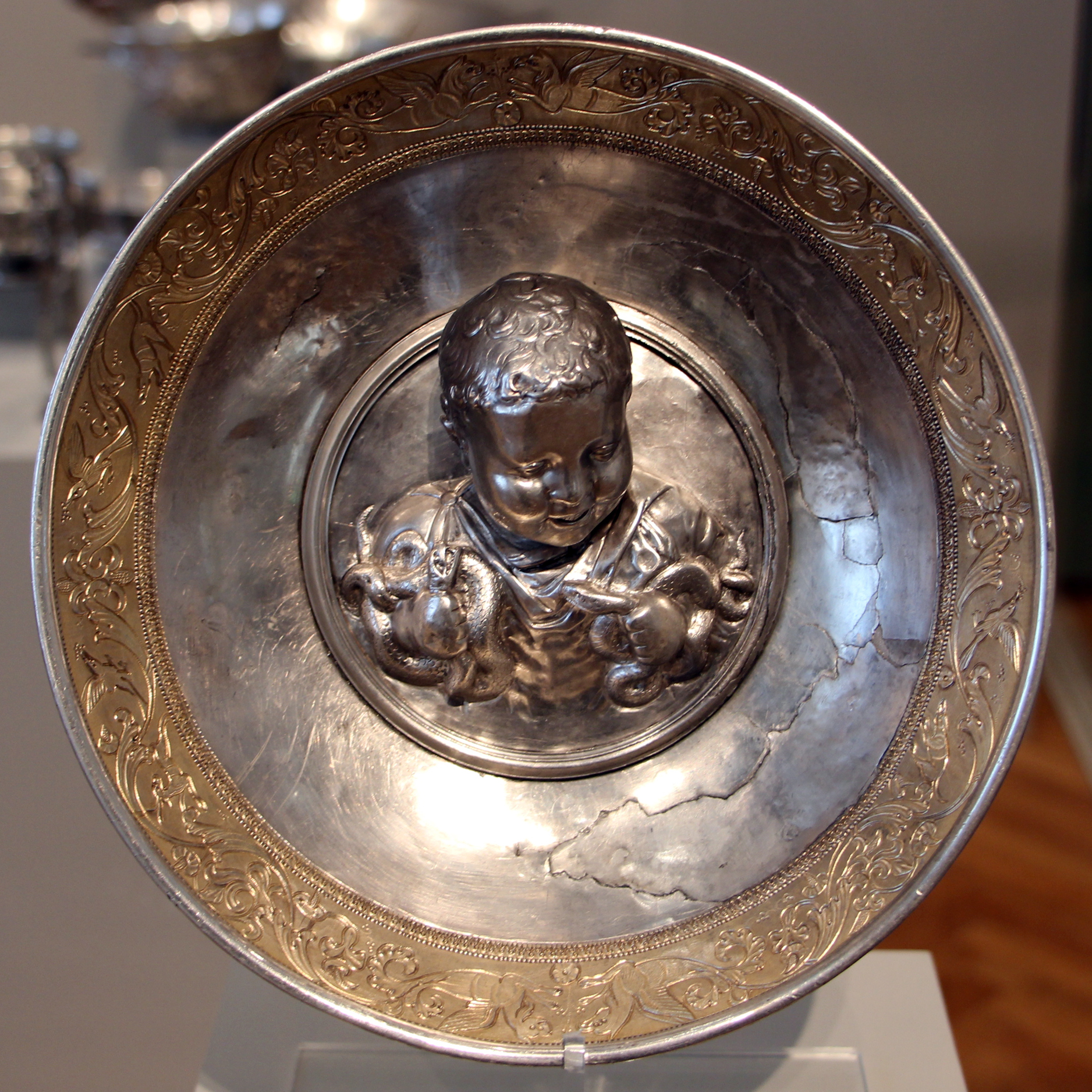
A Roman gilded silver bowl depicting the boy Hercules strangling two serpents, from the Hildesheim Treasure, 1st century CE, Altes Museum

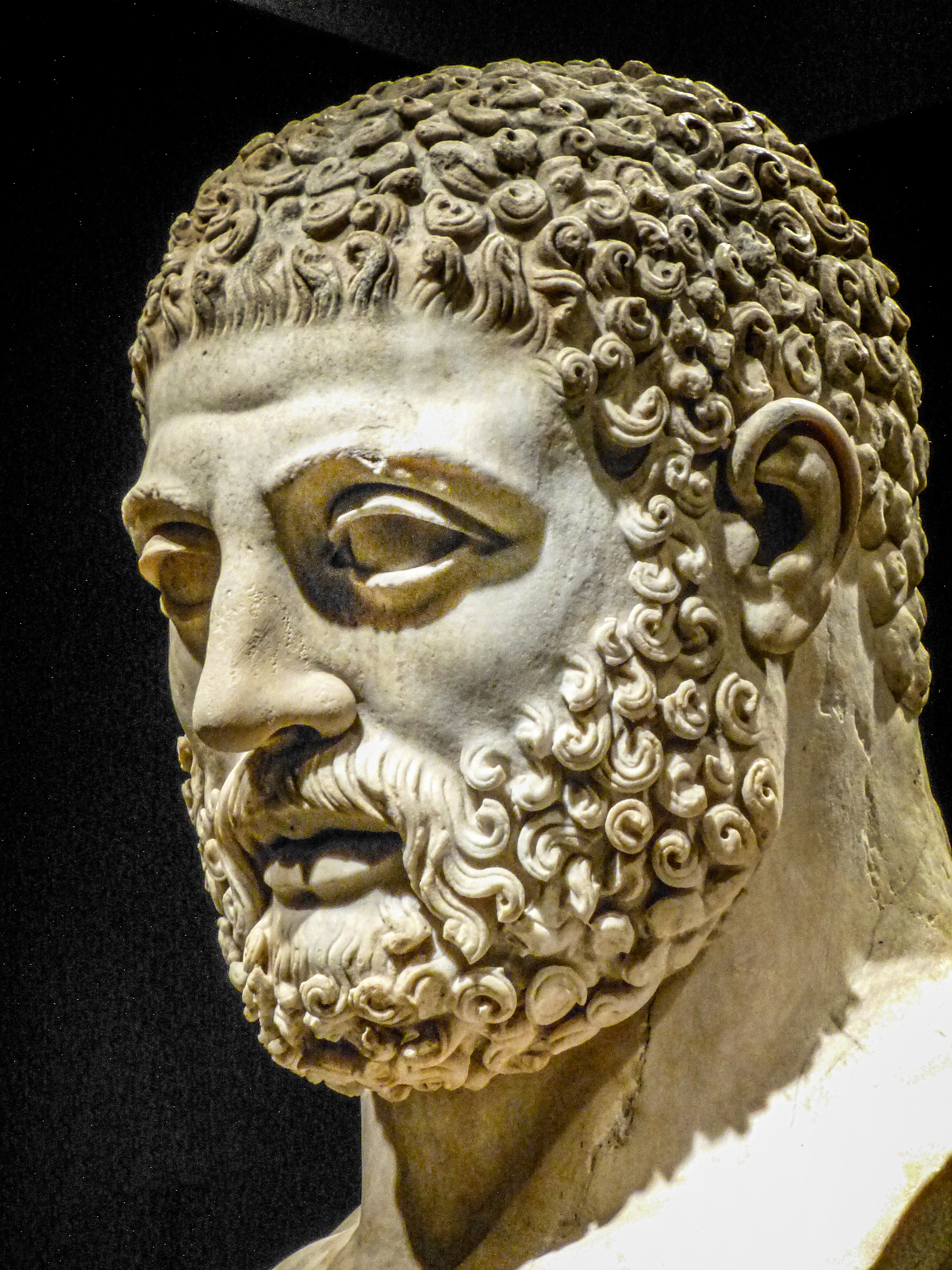
Head from statue of Herakles (Hercules) Roman 117–188 CE from villa of the emperor Hadrian at Tivoli, Italy at the British Museum

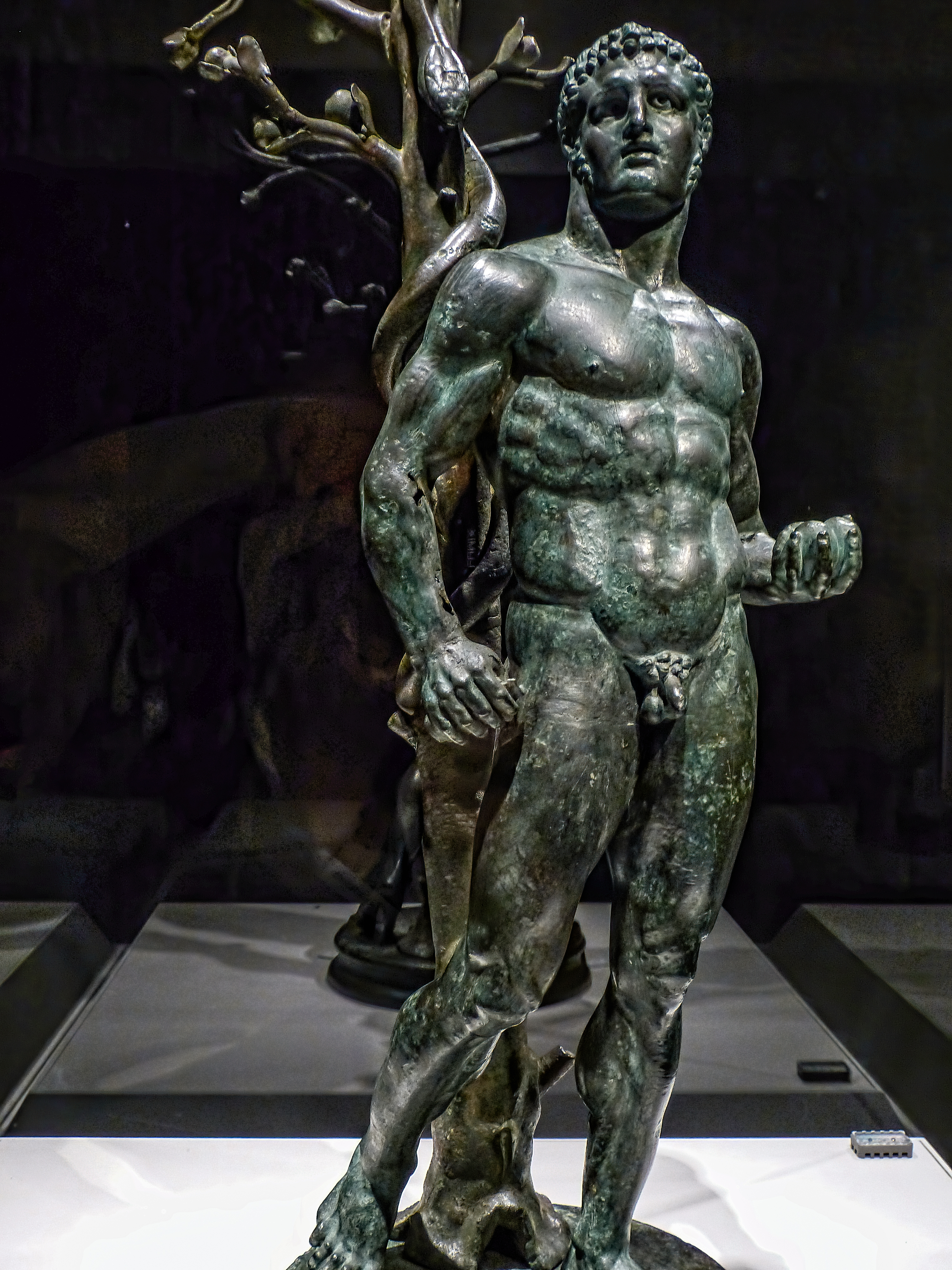
Hercules (Herakles) with the Apples of the Hesperides Roman 1st century CE from a temple at Byblos, Lebanon at the British Museum

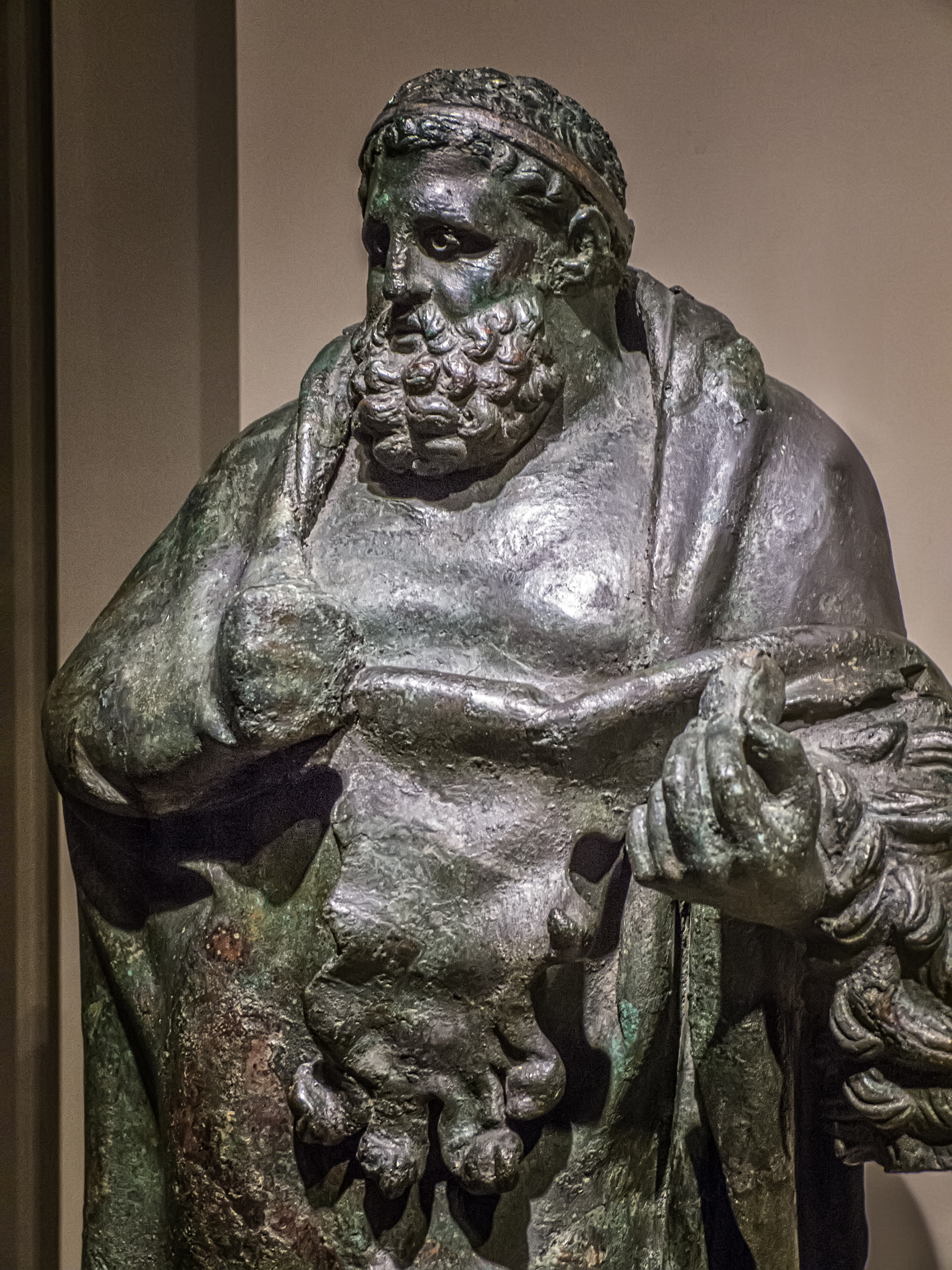
Hercules from Cappadocia or Caesarea 1st century BCE – 1st century CE, Walters Art Museum

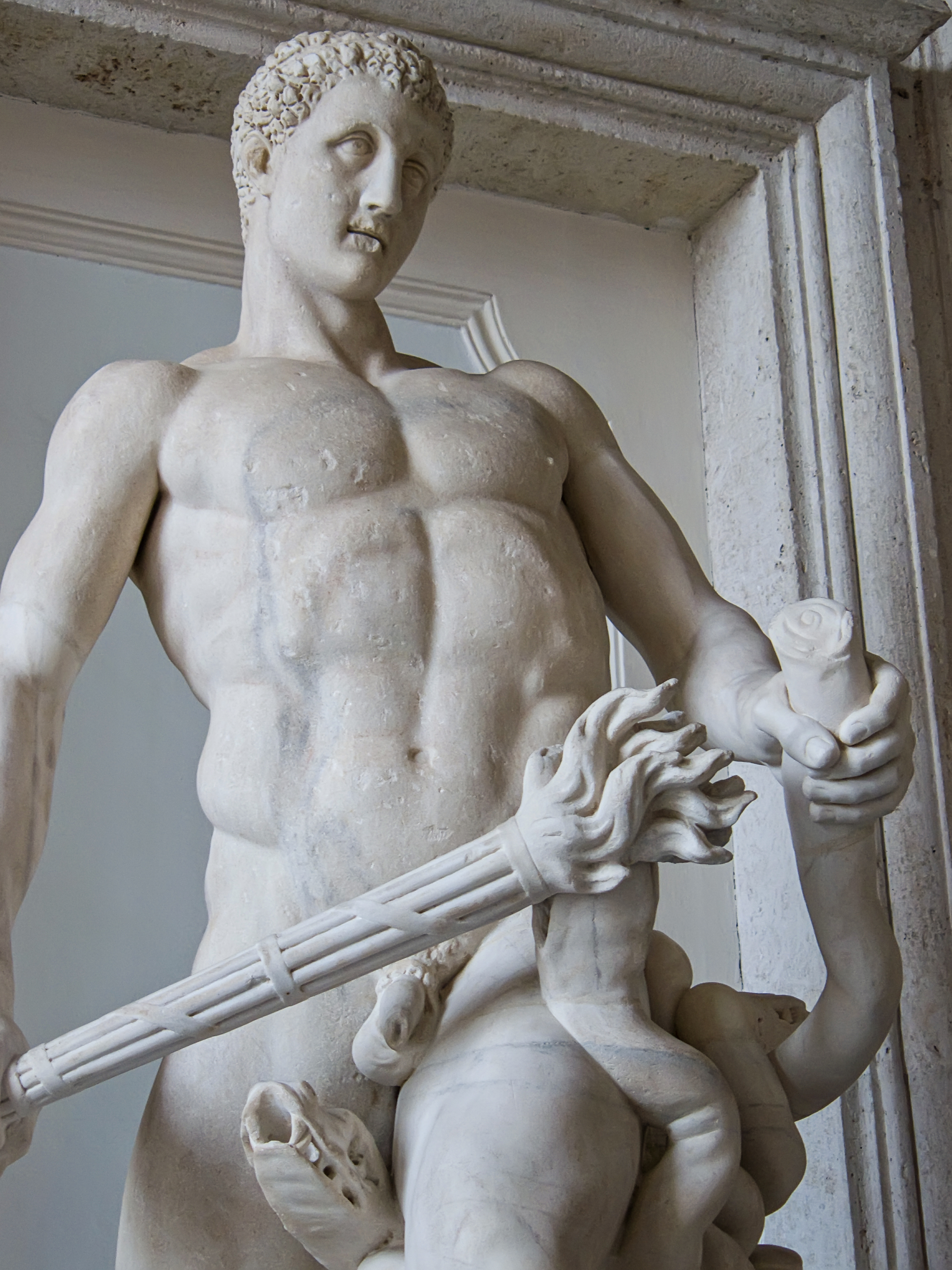
Hercules slaying the Hydra Roman copy of 4th century BCE original by Lysippos, Capitoline Museum

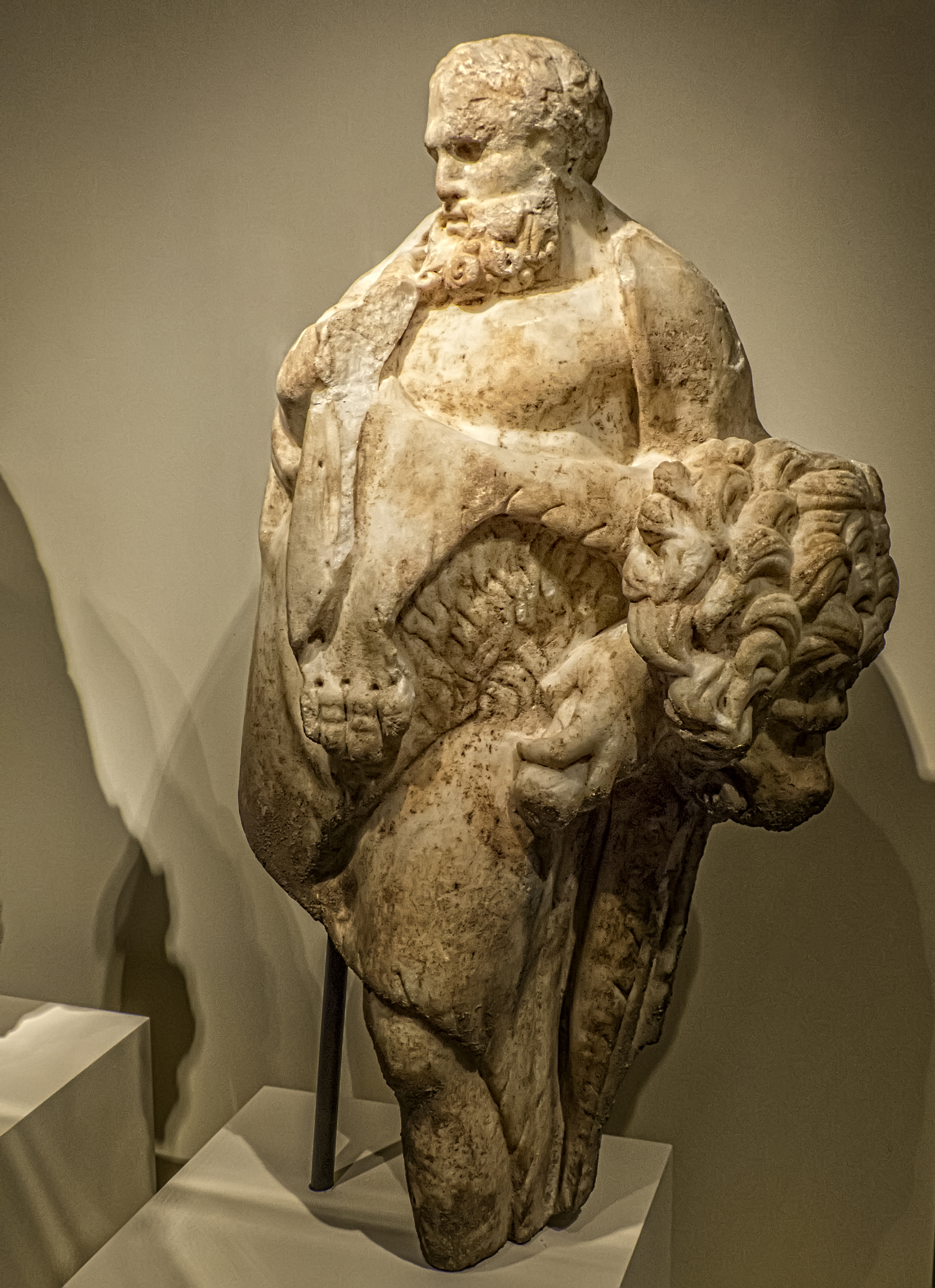
Hercules Roman 1st century BCE – 1st century CE, Walters Art Museum

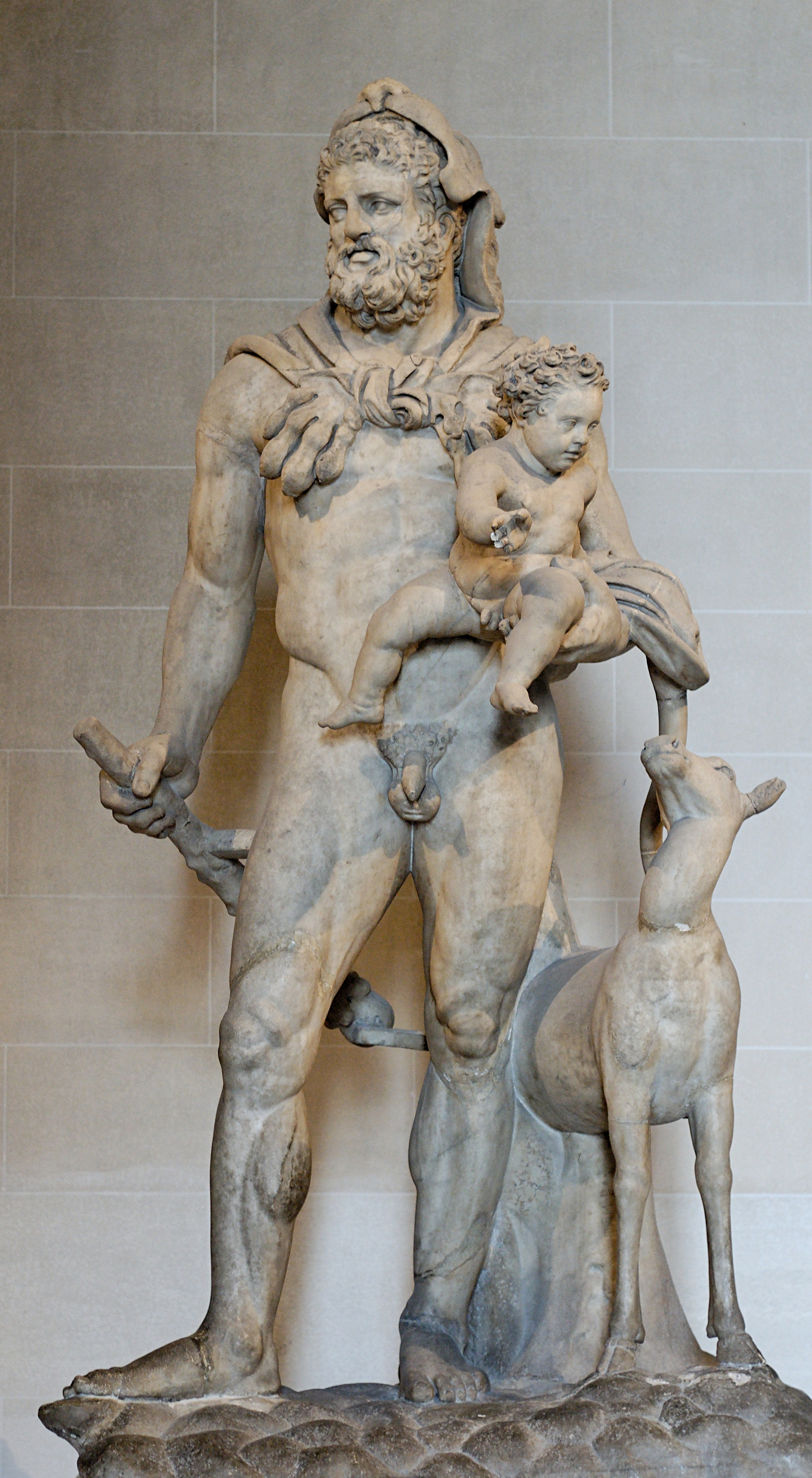
Herakles and Telephos Louvre MR219

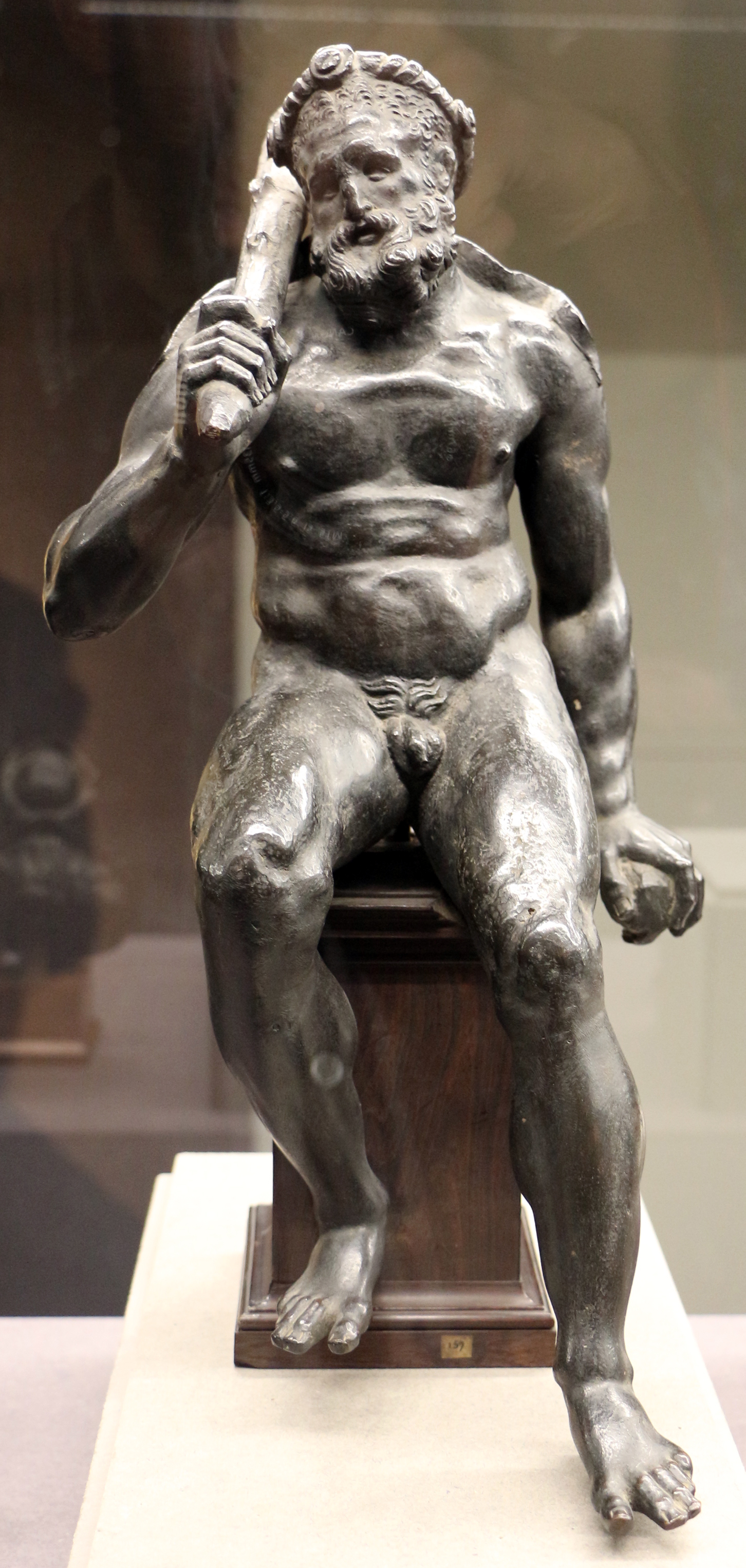
Hercules, 50 BCE – 50 CE, MAN Florence

=== Modern era ===
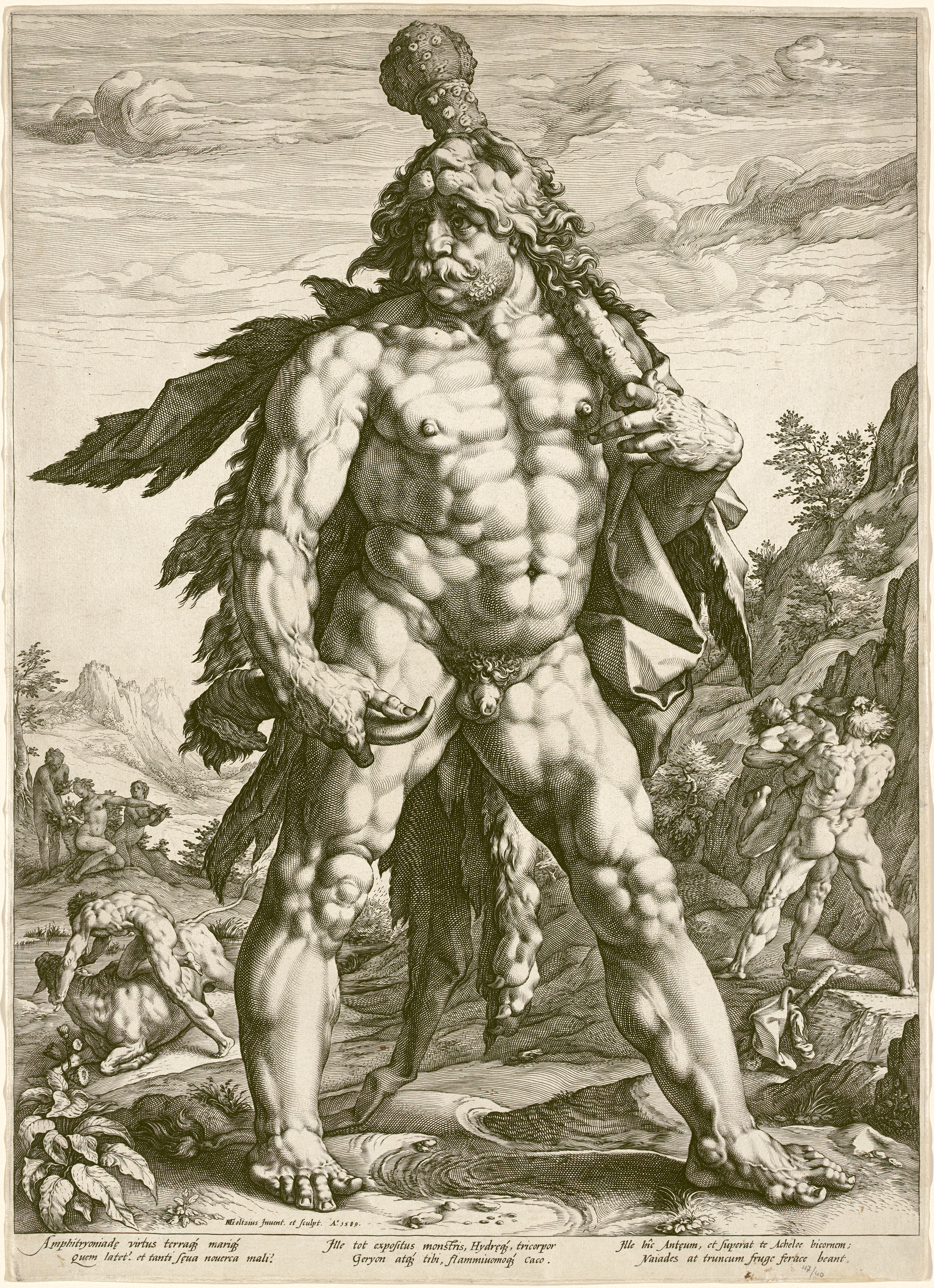
The Giant Hercules (1589) by Hendrik Goltzius

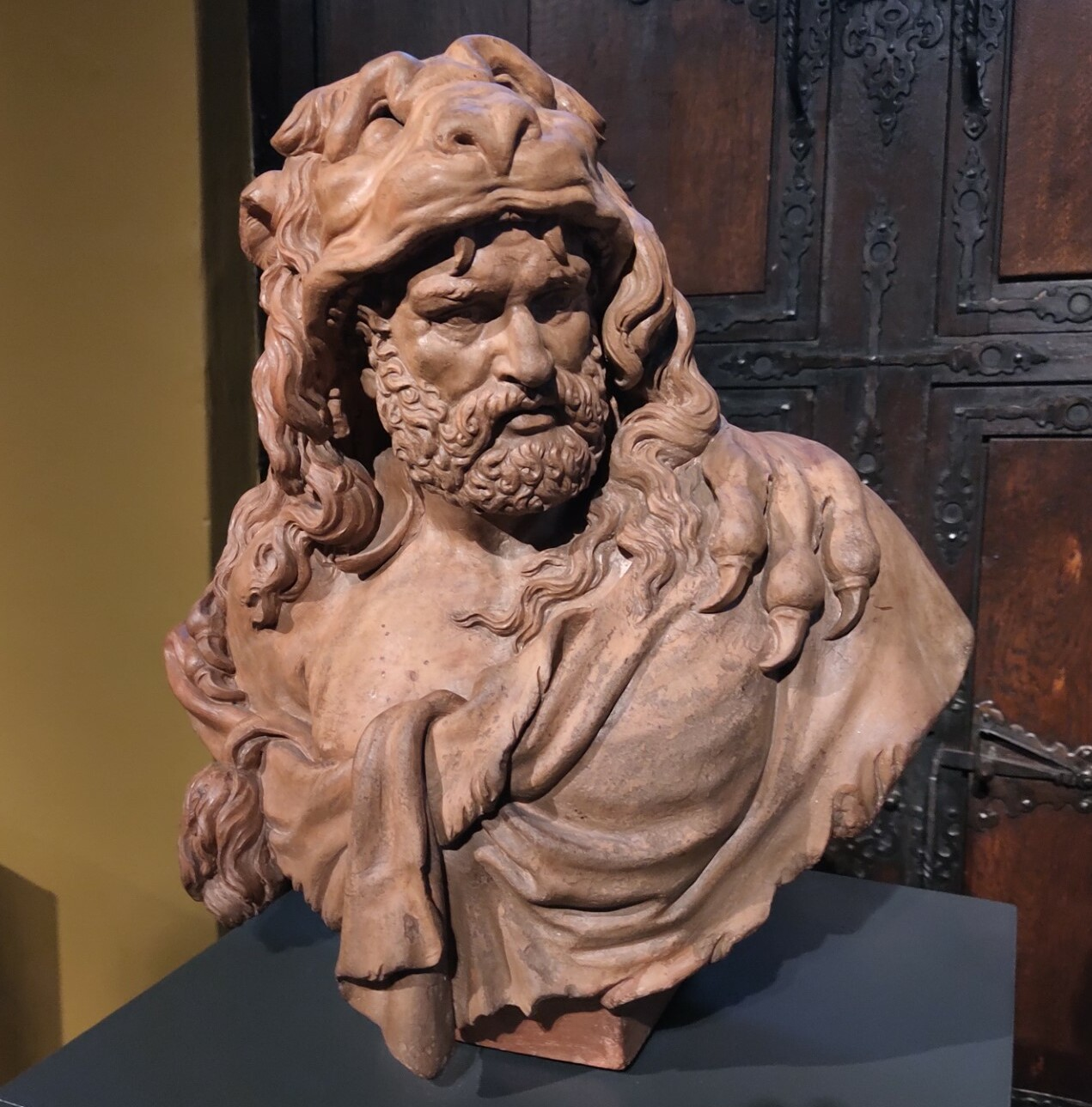
Lucas Faydherbe, Bust of Hercules – collection King Baudouin Foundation

The Drunken Hercules (1612–1614) by Rubens

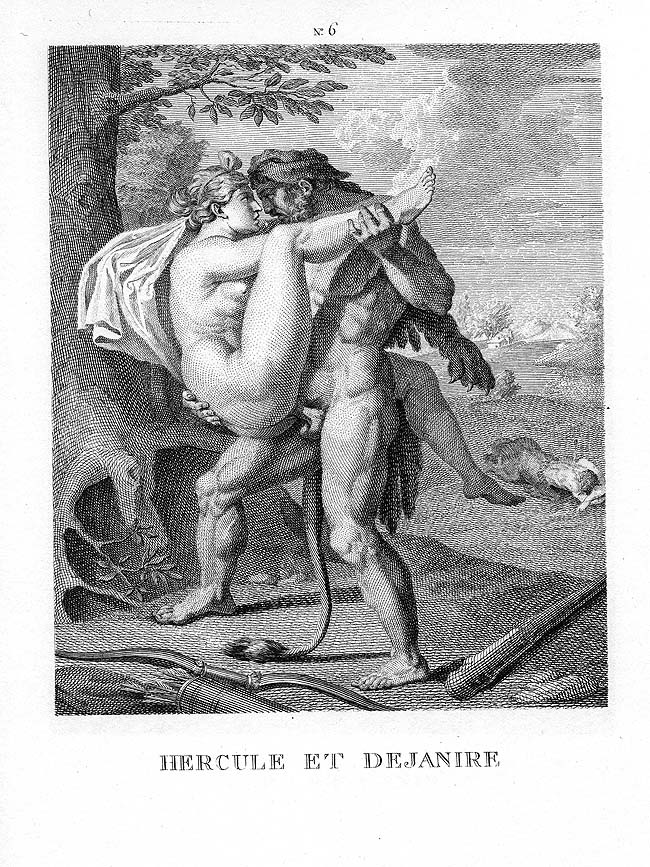
Hercules and Deianira (18th-century copy of a lost original), from I Modi

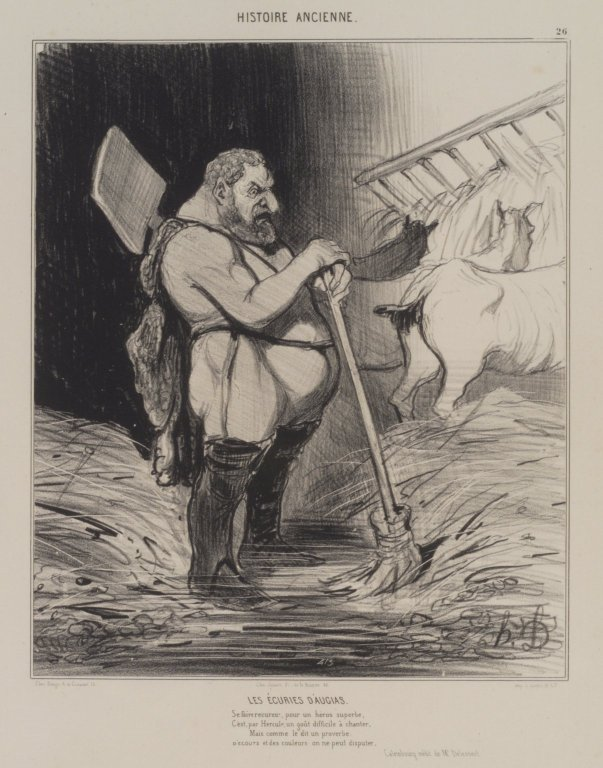
Hercules in the Augean stable (1842, Honoré Daumier)

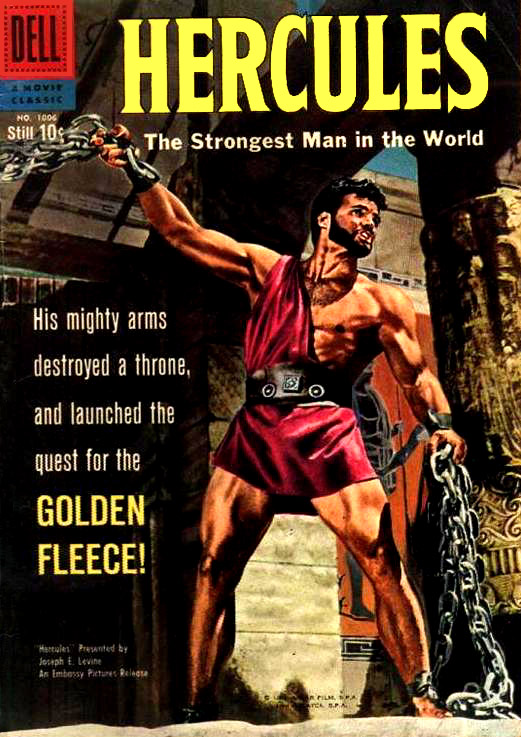
Comic book cover (c. 1958)

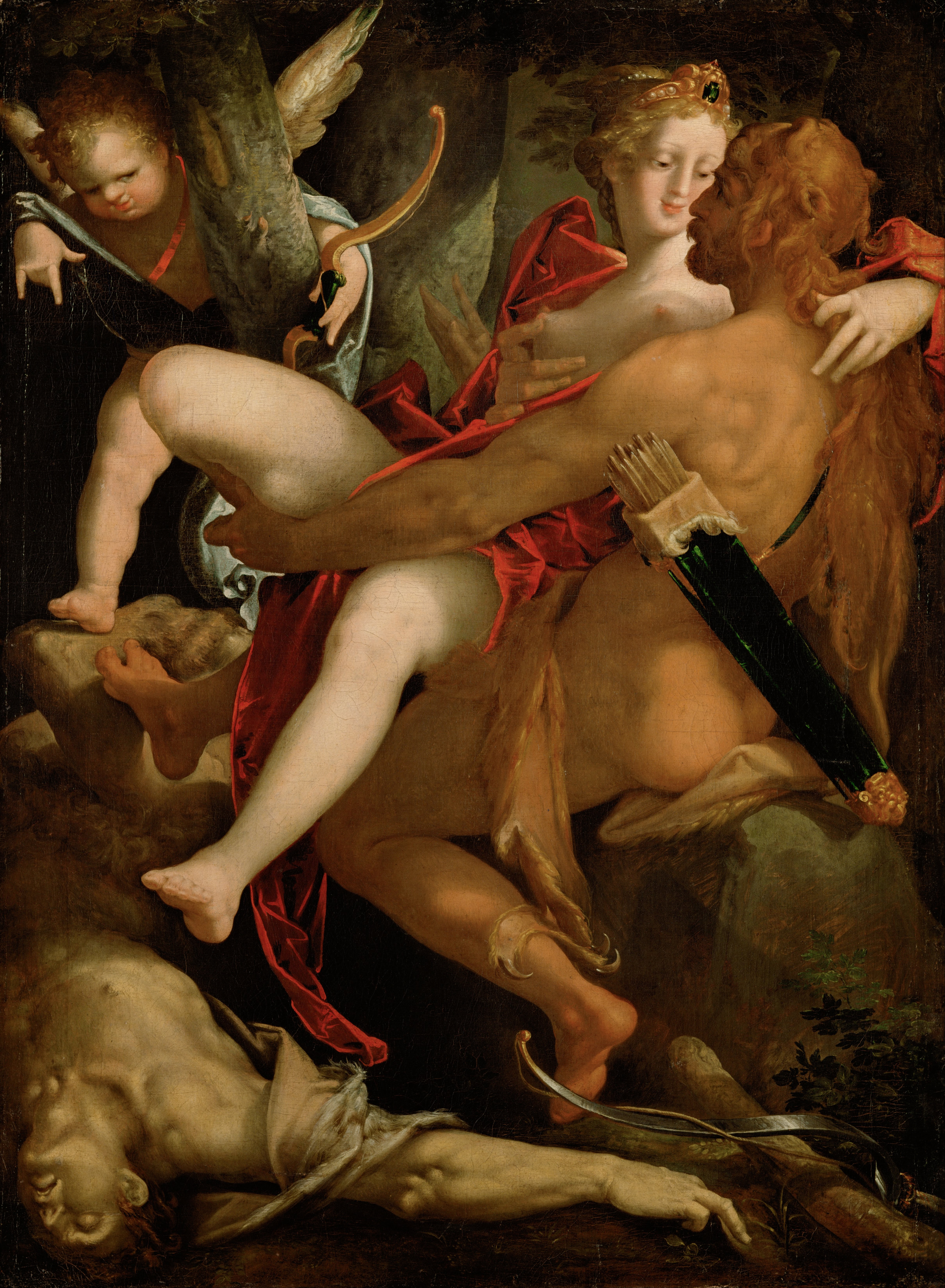
Hercules, Deianira and the Centaur Nessus, by Bartholomäus Spranger, 1580–1582

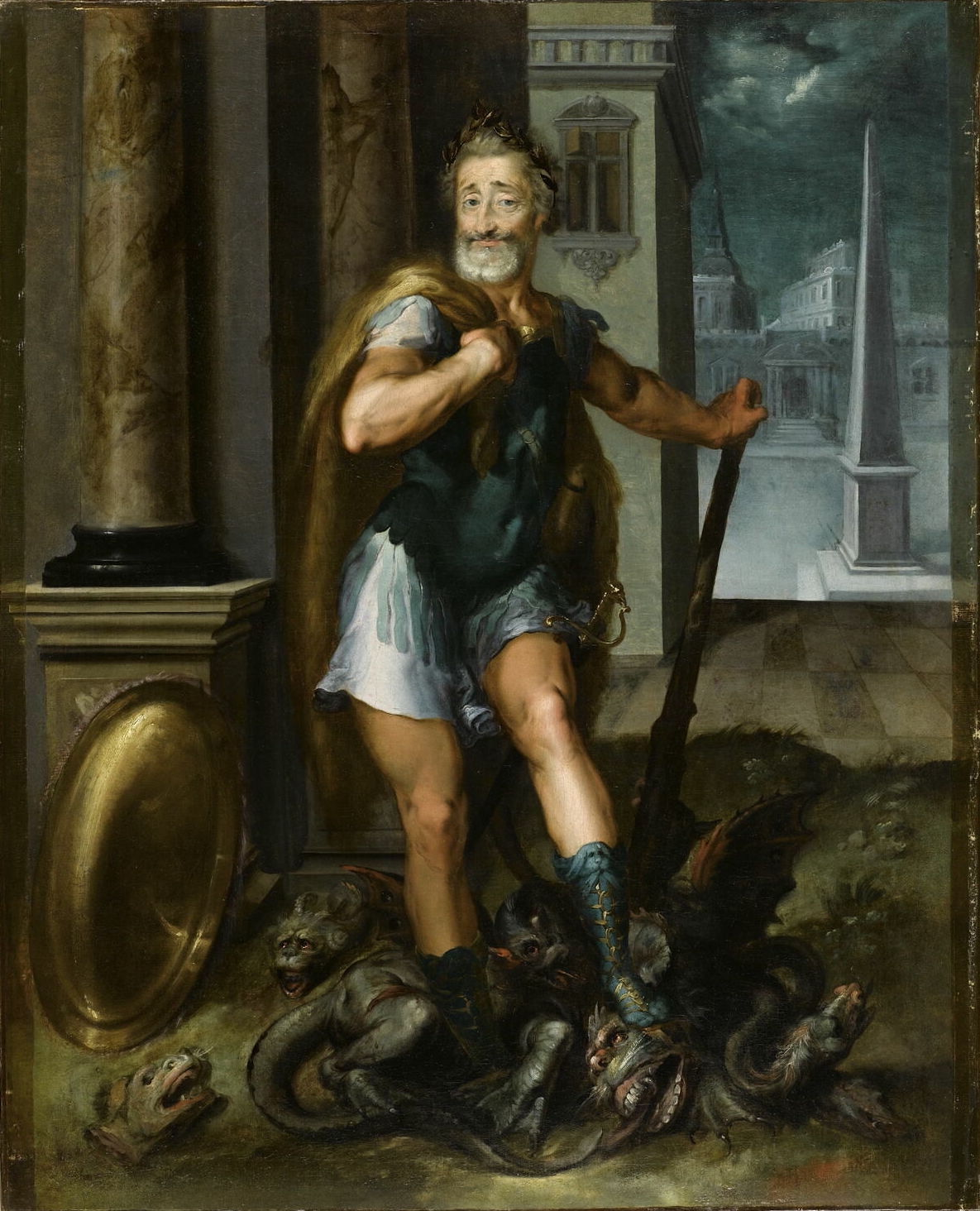
Henry IV of France, as Hercules vanquishing the Lernaean Hydra (i.e. the Catholic League), by Toussaint Dubreuil, c. 1600. Louvre Museum

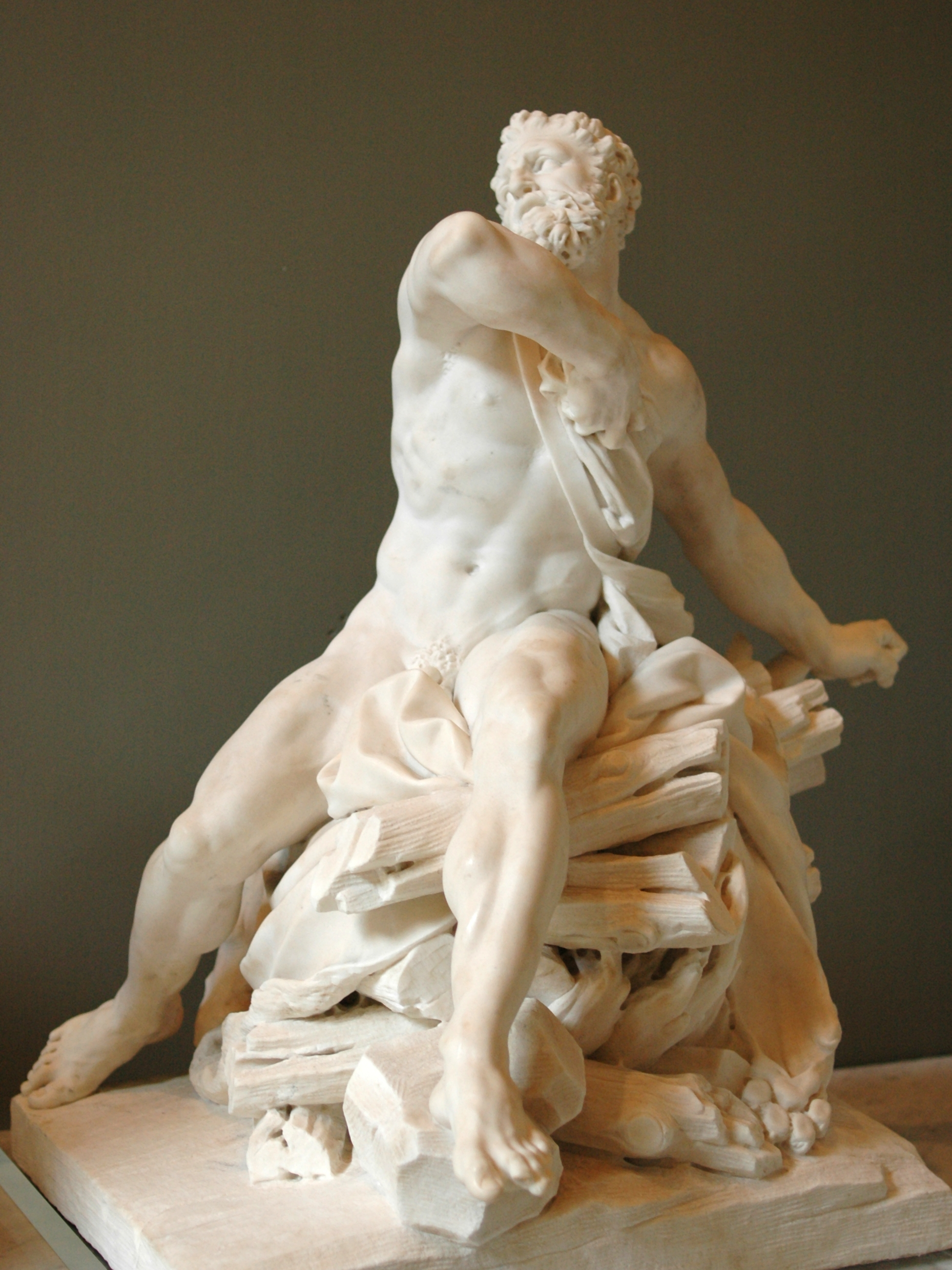
Hercules on the Pyre by Guillaume Coustou The Elder, 1704, Louvre MR1809

=== In numismatics ===
Hercules was among the earliest figures on ancient Roman coinage, and has been the main motif of many collector coins and medals since. One example is the Austrian 20 euro Baroque Silver coin issued on September 11, 2002. The obverse side of the coin shows the Grand Staircase in the town palace of Prince Eugene of Savoy in Vienna, currently the Austrian Ministry of Finance. Gods and demi-gods hold its flights, while Hercules stands at the turn of the stairs.

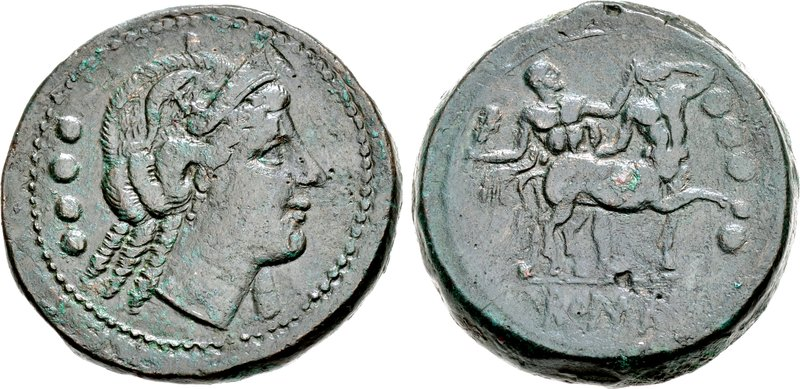
Juno, with Hercules fighting a Centaur on reverse (Roman, 215–15 BCE)

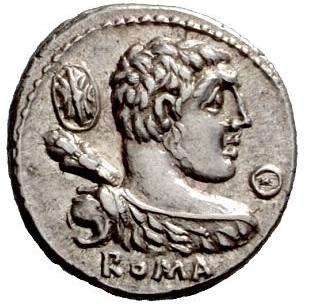
Club over his shoulder on a Roman denarius (c. 100 BCE)

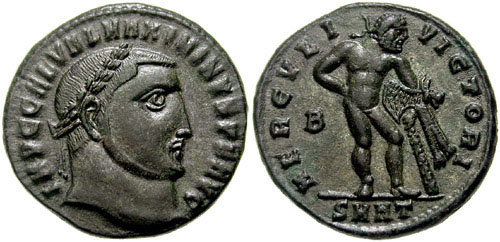
Maximinus II and Hercules with club and lionskin (Roman, 313 CE)

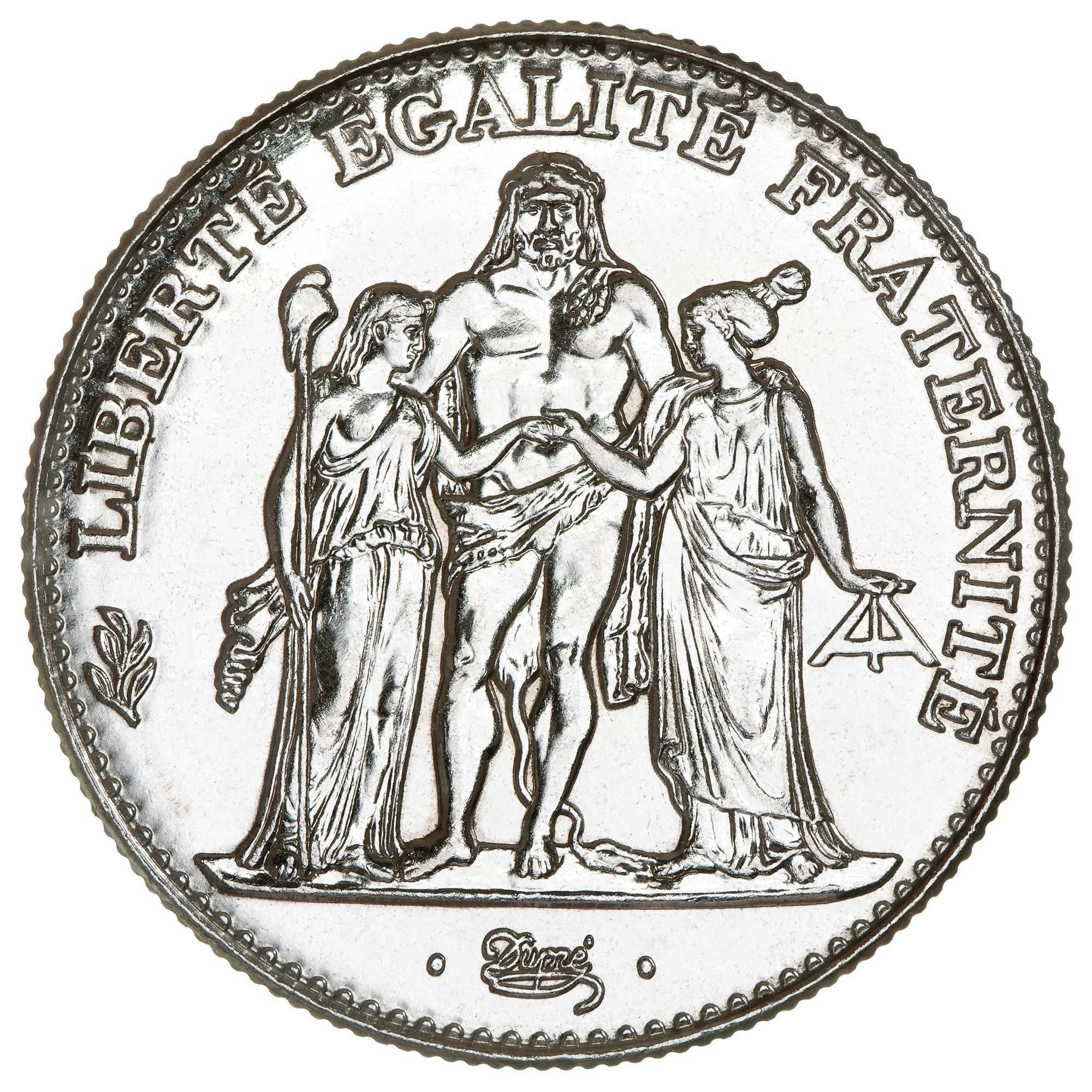
Commemorative 5-franc piece (1996), Hercules in center

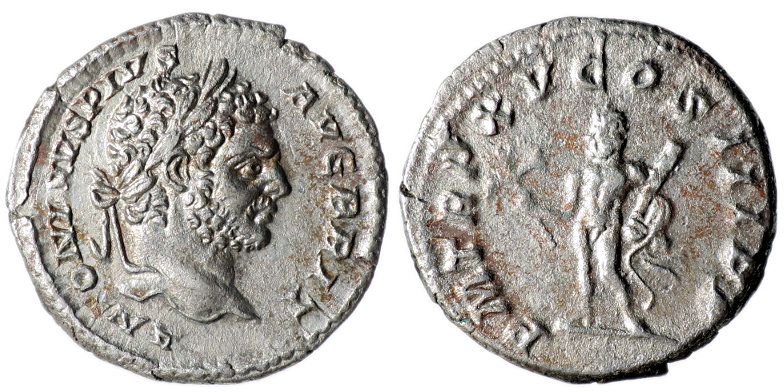
Hercules, as seen on a Denarius of the Roman Emperor Caracalla. Dated 212 CE

=== Military ===
Six successive ships of the British Royal Navy, from the 18th to the 20th century, bore the name HMS Hercules.

In the French Navy, there were no fewer than nineteen ships called Hercule, plus three more named Alcide, which is another name of the same hero.

Hercules's name was also used for five ships of the US Navy, four ships of the Spanish Navy, four of the Argentine Navy, and two of the Swedish Navy, as well as for numerous civilian sailing and steam ships.

In modern aviation a military transport aircraft produced by Lockheed Martin carries the designation Lockheed C-130 Hercules.

Operation Herkules was the German code-name given to an abortive plan for the invasion of Malta during the Second World War.

=== Other cultural references ===
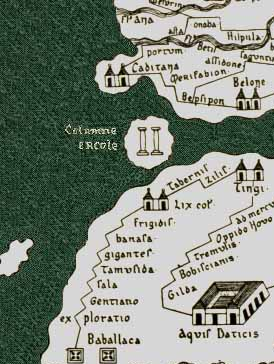
Pillars of Hercules, representing the Strait of Gibraltar (19th-century conjecture of the Tabula Peutingeriana)

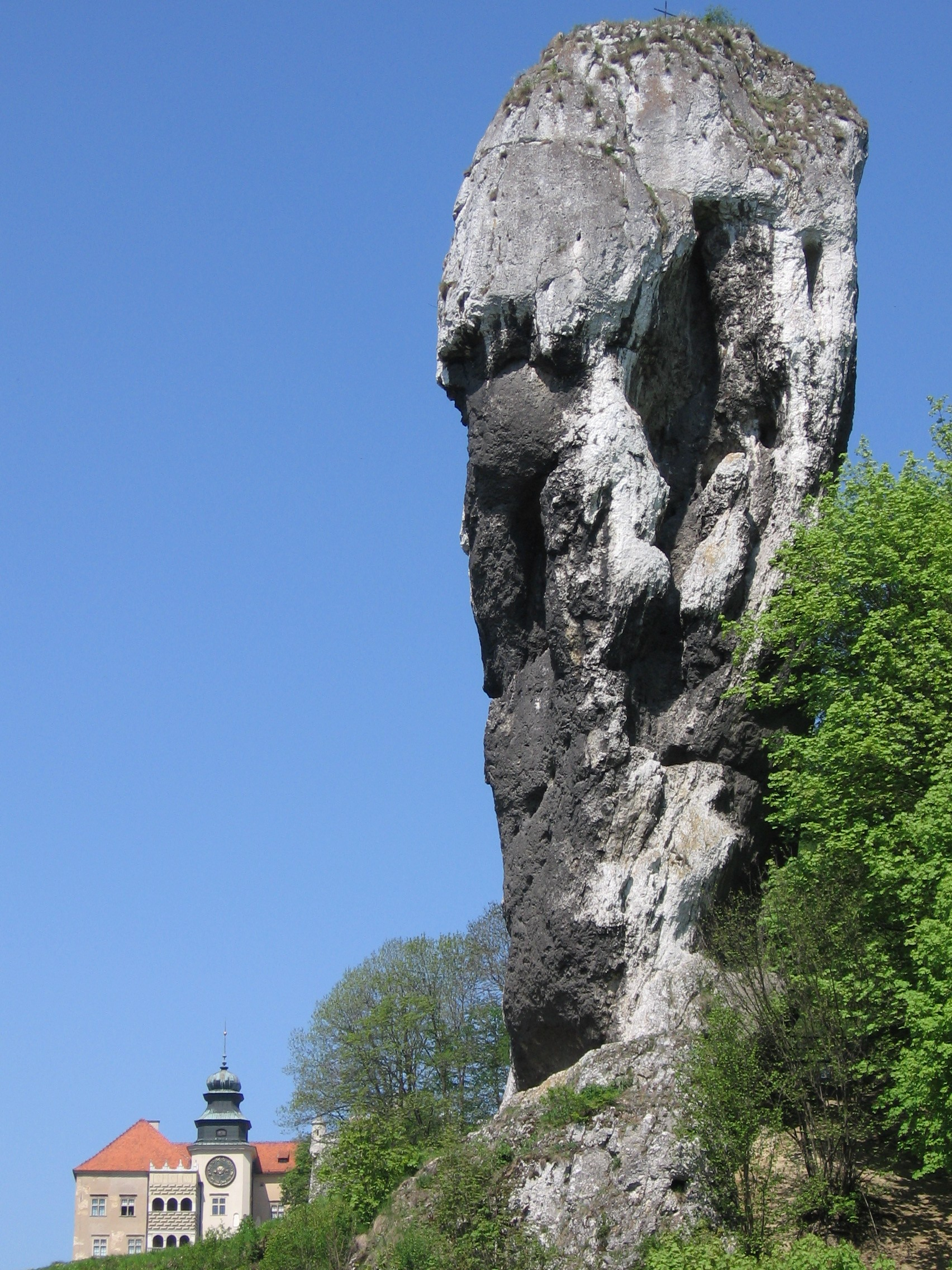
The Cudgel of Hercules, a tall limestone rock formation, with Pieskowa Skała Castle in the background

Hercules as heraldic supporters in the royal arms of Greece, in use 1863–1973. The phrase "Ηρακλείς του στέμματος" ("Defenders of the Crown") has pejorative connotations ("chief henchmen") in Greek.

=== In films ===
A series of nineteen Italian Hercules movies were made in the late 1950s and early 1960s. The actors who played Hercules in these films were Steve Reeves, Gordon Scott, Kirk Morris, Mickey Hargitay, Mark Forest, Alan Steel, Dan Vadis, Brad Harris, Reg Park, Peter Lupus (billed as Rock Stevens), and Michael Lane. A number of English-dubbed Italian films that featured the name of Hercules in their title were not intended to be movies about Hercules.

== See also ==
- Cú Chulainn
- Demigod
- Gilgamesh
- Hercules (comics)
- Hercules in popular culture of the 20th and 21st centuries
- Hercules: The Legendary Journeys
- Melqart
- Samson
- Strength (tarot card)
- Sword-and-sandal
