= Hercules (disambiguation) =

Hercules is the Roman adaptation of the Greek mythological hero Heracles.

Hercules may also refer to:

== Animals ==
- Hercules beetle
- Hercules (bear) (1975–2001), Scottish wrestling bear
- Hercules (liger), the world's largest living cat
- Hercules moth, of family Saturniidae
- Hercules parrot, an extinct giant parrot species from New Zealand

== Arts and entertainment ==
=== Fictional characters ===
- Hercules (comics), various versions of the mythical hero in comics
- Hercules (Disney character)
- Hercules (TUGS), in the British children's television series TUGS
- Hercules Grytpype-Thynne, from the British 1950s comedy radio programme The Goon Show
- Hercules, a superhero in the 1970s Filmation animated cartoon Space Sentinels

=== Film ===
- Hercules (1958 film), starring Steve Reeves
- Hercules (1983 film), starring Lou Ferrigno
  - The Adventures of Hercules (1985 film), sequel to the 1983 film
- Hercules (1997 film), a Disney animated film
- Hercules (2014 film), an action-adventure film starring Dwayne Johnson

=== Television ===
- The Mighty Hercules, a 1963–1966 Canadian-American animated television show
- Hercules: The Legendary Journeys, a 1995–1999 American syndicated action television series starring Kevin Sorbo
- Hercules (1998 TV series), based on the 1997 Disney film
- Hercules (miniseries), a 2005 American television miniseries that aired on NBC

=== Music ===
- Hercules (Handel), a music drama by George Frideric Handel
- "Hercules", a 1973 song by Aaron Neville
- "Hercules", a song by Midnight Oil from their 1985 EP Species Deceases
- Hercules (soundtrack), for the 1997 Disney film
- "Hercules", a song from Elton John's 1972 album Honky Château
- "Hercules", a song from George Watsky's 2009 album Watsky
- "Hercules", a song from Young Thug's 2016 mixtape I'm Up

=== Video games ===
- Hercules (1984 video game), for home computers
- Disney's Hercules (video game), 1997, based on the Disney film

=== Other arts and entertainment ===
- Hercules (franchise), a Disney media franchise
- Hercules (musical), 2019, based on the 1997 Disney film
- Hercules (Piero della Francesca), a 15th-century fresco
- Hercules (Seneca), a play

== Astronomy ==
- Hercules (constellation), in the northern hemisphere
  - Hercules (dwarf galaxy), near the Milky Way galaxy
  - Hercules Superclusters
    - Hercules Cluster
- Hercules (crater), a lunar impact crater

== Businesses ==
- Hercules (Bulgarian company), a defunct maker of commercial vehicles
- Hercules (nightclub), Helsinki, Finland
- Hercules (vehicles), a Greek manufacturer of farm vehicles
- Hercules Computer Technology, a former computer peripheral manufacturer
- Hercules Cycle and Motor Company, a former British bicycle manufacturer
- Hercules Engine Company, in Canton, Ohio, US
- Hercules Gas Engine Company, in Cincinnati, Ohio, US
- Hercules Inc., a chemical company which merged with and became Ashland, Inc.

== Military ==
- HMS Hercules, any of several Royal Navy ships
- Hughes H-4 Hercules, a prototype strategic airlift flying boat
- Lockheed C-130 Hercules, an American military transport aircraft
- Bristol Hercules, a British aircraft engine
- Nike Hercules, a surface-to-air missile used by US and NATO armed forces
- M88 Hercules, a US Army armored battlefield recovery vehicle

== Civil aircraft ==
- Lockheed L-100 Hercules

== People ==
=== Mononym or professional name ===
- Hercules (gangster) (born 1960s), Indonesian crime boss
- Hercules (serial killer), Unidentified serial killer active in Bangladesh 2019
- Hercules (wrestler), WWF professional wrestler Ray Fernandez (1956–2004)
- Ruben Cruz (1950–2020), Puerto Rican professional wrestler known by his ring name, Hercules Ayala
- Richard Sandrak (born 1992), American bodybuilder known as Little Hercules

=== Given name ===
- Hércules Brito Ruas (born 1939), Brazilian footballer known as Brito
- Hercules Brabazon Brabazon (1821–1906), English artist
- Hercules Burnett (1865–1936), American baseball player
- Hércules de Miranda (1912–1982), Brazilian footballer
- Hércules Florence (1804–1879), French-Brazilian painter and inventor
- Hercules Huncks (died 1660), English soldier, one of the Regicides of King Charles I
- Hercules Kyvelos (born 1975), Canadian welterweight boxer
- Sir Hercules Langrishe, 1st Baronet (1729–1811), Irish politician
- Sir Hercules Langrishe, 5th Baronet (1859–1943), Irish soldier, sailor and yachtsman
- Hercules Linton (1836–1900), Scottish shipbuilder and designer
- Hercules Mata'afa (born 1995), American football player
- Hercules Mulligan, (1740–1825), tailor and spy for the patriot forces in the American Revolutionary War
- Hércules Pereira do Nascimento (born 2000), Brazilian footballer
- Hercules Posey (1748–1812), slave owned by George Washington
- Hercules Read (Charles Hercules Read, 1857–1929), British archaeologist and curator at the British Museum
- Hercules Robinson, 1st Baron Rosmead (1824–1897), the 5th governor of Hong Kong
- Hercules Ross (1745–1816), Scottish merchant involved in the campaign for the abolition of the slave trade
- Hercules Seghers (1589–1638), Dutch painter and printmaker
- Hercules Taylour (1759–1790), Irish soldier and politician

=== Surname ===
- Kylie Hercules (born 1989), Saint Helena politician and official
- Olia Hercules (born 1984), London-based Ukrainian chef, food writer and food stylist

== Places ==
- Hercules, California, a small town
- Hercules, Missouri, an unincorporated community
- Hercules (House of Assembly of South Africa constituency)
- Mount Hercules, Antarctica
- Port Hercules, Monaco

== Teams ==
- Hércules (Salvadoran football club)
- Hércules CF, a football team based in Alicante, Spain
- JS Hercules, a football team based in Oulu, Finland
- USV Hercules, a football club based in Utrecht, Netherlands

== Technology ==
- Nikon NASA F4, one of the first digital cameras, used by NASA as HERCULES
- Hercules (emulator), an IBM mainframe emulator
- Hercules (processors), a line of safety microcontrollers from Texas Instruments
- Hercules Graphics Card, an early graphics card for the IBM PC
- Hercules PSU, a power supply unit for audiophile turntables

== Transportation ==
- de Havilland Hercules, 1920s British airliner and mailplane
- Fletcher Hercules, American ultralight trike aircraft
- Hercules (1872–1889), one of the ten South Devon Railway Buffalo class steam locomotives
- Hercules, one of the GWR 3031 Class locomotives run on the Great Western Railway between 1891 and 1915
- Hercules (ship), various ships
- SS Hercules, several steamships
- Hercules (motorcycle), built by Sachs Motorcycles
- Hercules (locomotive), built in 1838 for the Beaver Meadow Railroad
- Hughes H-4 Hercules, better known as the "Spruce Goose", American 1940s prototype flying boat, the largest ever built
- Paladin Hercules, American powered parachute design
- Hercules Cycles, brand of bicycles produced by Tube Investments of India
- Hercules station, proposed train station and ferry terminal for Hercules, California

== Other ==
- Judge Hercules, a metaphorical "ideal judge" posited by legal philosopher Ronald Dworkin
- Hercules (roller coaster), former structure in Allentown, Pennsylvania
- Hercules (tree), a giant sequoia in the Mountain Home Grove, California
- Winter Storm Hercules, designated by The Weather Channel in the US in 2014
- Resupply Depot Hercules, an orbiting space station concept by Bigelow Aerospace
- Hercules silver mine, in the Coeur d'Alene Mountains, Idaho
- The "Hercules gene", a popular name for variants of the MSTN gene coding for myostatin
- Hercules, an Australian brand of zipper storage bags owned by International Consolidated Business Group

== See also ==
- Pillars of Hercules, the promontories that flank the entrance to the Strait of Gibraltar
- Temple of Hercules (disambiguation)
- Farnese Hercules, an ancient sculpture made for the Baths of Caracalla in Rome
- Hercules the Archer, a 1909 sculpture by Antoine Bourdelle
- Herkules (disambiguation)
- Hercule (disambiguation)
- Heracles (disambiguation)
- Herakles (disambiguation)
- Ercole (disambiguation), Italian form of the name
- Herc (disambiguation)
