= Herc =

Herc may refer to:

== People ==
- Christián Herc (born 1998), Slovak footballer
- DJ Kool Herc (born 1955), Jamaican-born DJ credited with originating hip hop music
- Ernest Alley (c. 1904 – 1971), American college football player and head coach and track athlete and head coach
- Herc McIntyre, head of Universal Pictures in Australia from 1920 until the 1950s
- Hercules Herc Vollugi (1880–1960), Australian rules footballer

== Fictional characters ==
- Herc (The Wire) (Detective Thomas "Herc" Hauk), a fictional character on the HBO drama series The Wire
- Herc (Hercules), the title character of the 1998 animated Disney TV series Hercules
- Dr. Herman "Herc" Armstrong, a character in the 1986 animated series Inhumanoids
- Hercules "Herc" Hansen, a character in the film Pacific Rim
- Captain Hercules "Herc" Shipwright, a recurring character in the British radio series Cabin Pressure
- Herc Stormsailor, a main character in the French/North American animated TV show Jayce and the Wheeled Warriors
- a playable character in Herc's Adventures, a video game released in 1997
- Humaniform-Emulation Roboticized Combat Unit with Leg-Articulated Navigation (HERC for short), a war machine in the video game Metaltech: Earthsiege and its sequels

== Groups, organizations, companies ==
- Hertz Equipment Rental Corporation, a heavy equipment rental division of the Hertz Corporation that became an independently publicly traded company called Herc Holdings Inc. in 2016
- Higher Education Recruitment Consortium
- Helicopter Engineering Research Corporation, predecessor of Jovair, founded in 1946
- Health Economics Research Centre, Nuffield Department of Population Health, Oxford University, England, UK
- Health eResearch Centre, Manchester University, England, UK
- Trenton Hercs, later name of the now defunct Trenton Sting Canadian Junior "A" ice hockey team in the 2008–2009 season
- Radio Herc, a radio station in Kosovo

== Other uses ==
- Hennepin Energy Recovery Center, Minneapolis, Minnesota, US; a waste-to-energy plant
- HERC gene and enzyme family: HERC1, HERC2, HERC3, HERC4, HERC5, HERC6

== See also ==
- Hercules (disambiguation), many frequently abbreviated as "Herc"
- Hercule (disambiguation)
- Herk (disambiguation)
