= Ercole (name) =

Ercole is a masculine given name which is also used as a surname. Notable people with the name include:

== Given name ==
- Ercole dell'Abate (1573–1613), Italian painter
- Ercole Baldini (1933–2022), Italian road racing cyclist
- Ercole Bernabei (1622–1687), Italian composer
- Ercole Boero (1890–1952), Italian water polo player
- Ercole Bottrigari (1531–1612), Italian scholar and mathematician
- Ercole Calvi (1824–1900), Italian painter
- Ercole Cattaneo (1906–date of death unknown), Italian figure skater
- Ercole Chiaia (1836–1905), Italian spiritualist
- Ercole Consalvi (1757–1824), Italian Cardinal
- Ercole Coppola (1603–1658), Italian Roman Catholic prelate
- Ercole Dembowski (1812–1881), Italian astronomer
- Ercole dei Fedeli (c. 1465–c.1504–21), Italian goldsmith and master sword engraver
- Ercole Ferrata (1610–1686) Italian sculptor
- Ercole Gaibara (c. 1620–1690), Italian composer
- Ercole Gallegati (1911–1990) Italian wrestler and Olympic medalist
- Ercole Gennari (1597–1658), Italian painter
- Ercole Gonzaga (1505 1563), Italian Cardinal
- Ercole Grandi (c.1463–1525), Italian painter
- Ercole Graziadei (1900–1981), Italian lawyer
- Ercole Gualazzini (born 1944), Italian cyclist
- Ercole Lamia (died 1591), Italian Roman Catholic prelate
- Ercole Lupinacci (1933–2016), Italian bishop
- Ercole Marelli (1867–1922), Italian engineer and entrepreneur
- Ercole Antonio Mattioli (1640–1694), Italian politician
- Ercole Luigi Morselli (1882–1921), Italian writer
- Ercole Olgeni (1883–1947) Italian rower
- Ercole Pasquini (ca. 1560–1608 or 1619), Italian composer
- Ercole Patti (1903–1976), Italian writer and journalist
- Ercole Procaccini the Elder (1520–1595), Italian painter
- Ercole Procaccini the Younger (c. 1605–1675 or 1680), Italian painter
- Ercole Rabitti (1921–2009), Italian football striker and manager
- Ercole Rangoni (died 1527), Italian Cardinal
- Ercole del Rio (c.1718–c.1802), Italian lawyer and author
- Ercole de' Roberti (c.1451–1496), Italian painter
- Ercole Roncaglia (1886–1965), Italian military officer
- Ercole Ruggiero (17th century), Italian painter
- Ercole Sarti (1593–date of death unknown), Italian painter
- Ercole Sassonia (1551–1607), Italian physician
- Ercole Setti (c.1530–1618), Italian engraver
- Ercole Spada (1937–2025), Italian automobile designer
- Ercole Strozzi (1473–1508), Italian poet
- Ercole Tambosi (died 1570), Italian Roman Catholic prelate
- Ercole Visconti (1646–1712), Italian Roman Catholic prelate

== Surname ==
- Christine D'Ercole, American cyclist
- Francesco Ercole (1884–1945), Italian historian and politician
- Giovanni Battista Ercole (1750–1811), Italian painter and architect
- Henry Ercole (died 1764), Maltese philosopher
- Velia Ercole (1903–1978), Australian novelist

== Pseudonym ==
- Ercole Ercoli, pseudonym of Italian politician Palmiro Togliatti

== Fictional characters ==
- Ercole Visconti, in the Pixar film Luca
- Ercole, title character of Ercole amante, a 1662 opera
- Ercole, title character of Ercole amante (Bembo), a 1707 opera
- Ercole, title character of Ercole su'l Termodonte, a 1723 opera

== See also ==
- Ercole (disambiguation)
