= Ercolini =

Ercolini is an Italian surname. Notable people with the surname include:

- Béa Ercolini (born 1963), Belgian multimedia journalist
- Julián Ercolini, Argentine judge
- Rossano Ercolini, Italian school teacher

== See also ==
- Ercole (disambiguation)
