= Ercole =

Ercole, the Italian version of Hercules, can refer to:

== People and fictional characters ==
- Ercole (name), a list of people and fictional characters with the given name, surname or pseudonym
- Ercole I d'Este (1431–1505), Duke of Ferrara
- Ercole II d'Este (1508–1559), Duke of Ferrara, Modena and Reggio
- Ercole III d'Este (1727–1803), Duke of Modena and Reggio

== Other uses ==
- Italian tugboat Ercole, an Italian Navy coastal tugboat
- Ercole, a 1557 epic poem by Giovanni Battista Giraldi

== See also ==
- Porto Ercole, an Italian town
- Heracles (disambiguation)
- Hercules (disambiguation)
- Hercule (disambiguation)
