= Museo Archeologico Nazionale d'Abruzzo =

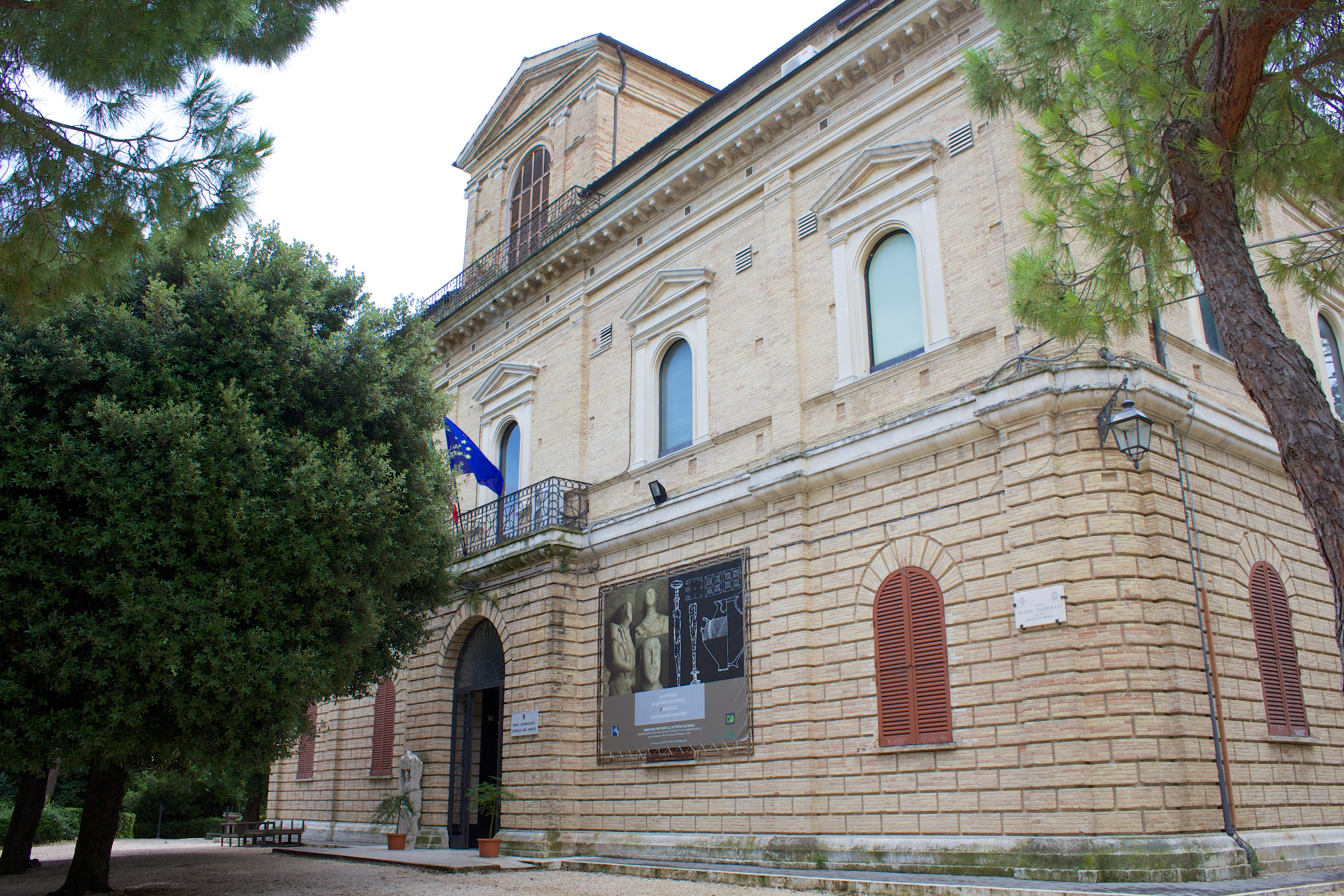
- Museo Archeologico Nazionale d'Abruzzo

- Location within Abruzzo
- Location: Chieti
- Coordinates: 42.3430°N 14.1645°E
- Type: Archaeology museum
- Website: www.archeoabruzzo.beniculturali.it

Museo Archeologico Nazionale d'Abruzzo (National Archaeology Museum of Abruzzo) is an archaeology museum in Chieti, Abruzzo.

== History, location and building ==
The seat of the museum is the former Baron Frigerj's villa, which was built in around 1830 by the Neapolitan architect Enrico Riccio and was sold to the comune of Chieti. The museum was founded thanks to Valerio Cianfarani, the local soprintendenza's director, and the comune of Chieti, which sold the Frigerj residence to the State, and was inaugurated in the presence of President of the Italian Republic Giovanni Gronchi, on 14 June 1959.

The Neoclassical building is characterized by smoothly covered brick and by windows with gables, and is surrounded by Villa comunale, Chieti's urban park. The main entrance is the former passage for the carriages to the gallery of the ground floor, which is connected to the first floor through a monumental scissor staircase supported by Doric columns.

== Collections ==
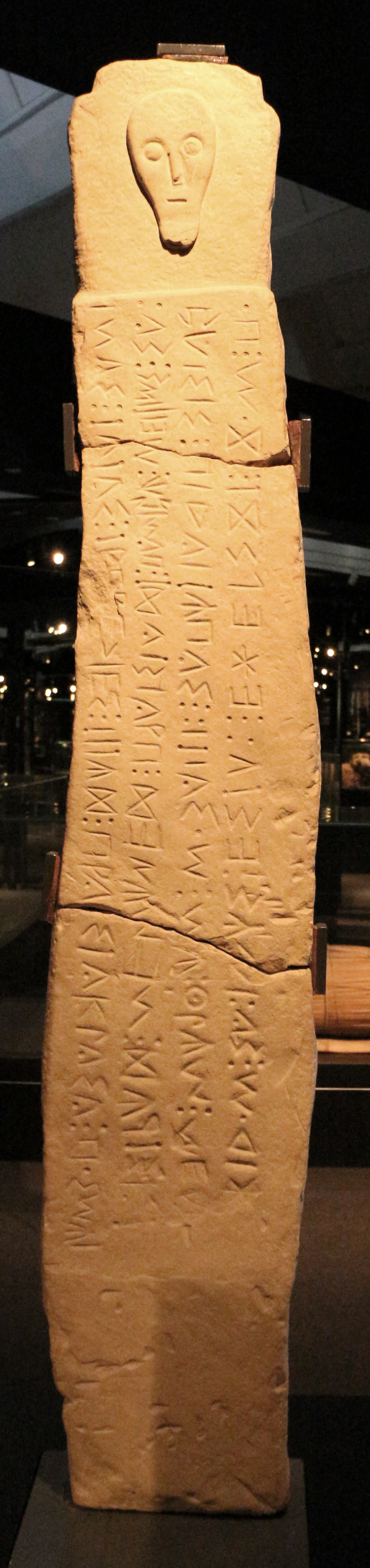
A stele from Penna Sant'Andrea

The National Museum Villa Frigerj contains most of the most important archaeological finds of Abruzzo from Prehistory to Late antiquity, including the Warrior of Capestrano, which was shown to Barack Obama during the 35th G8 summit.

In addition to the Warrior of Capestrano, on the ground floor are exposed Roman and pre-Roman sculptures, Roman iconographies, a numismatic collection, and the Pansa collection. The first floor is focused on the history of four ancient peoples of Abruzzo: the Vestini, the Peligni, the Carricini, and the Marrucini.

Among the artifacts exposed, there are three funerary stela with a paleosabellic inscription from Penna Sant'Andrea, aristocratic funeral beds of the cismontane Vestini people, a small bronze statue of Hercules Curinus from a sanctuary on the slopes of Mount Morrone, a monumental marble statue of Hercules from Alba Fucens, the Stele of Guardiagrele dated to the 7th century BC, the Torso of Rapino of the same age and the Lady of Capestrano, which is a headless female statue discovered along with the Warrior of Capestrano. The numismatic collection is composed by thousands of coins from the 4th century BC to the Italian unification, such as a rare golden coin bearing the face of Galba. The private collection, which was created by the lawyer and scholar Giovanni Pansa and donated in 1954, includes different bronze figures and other antiquities.

== Gallery ==
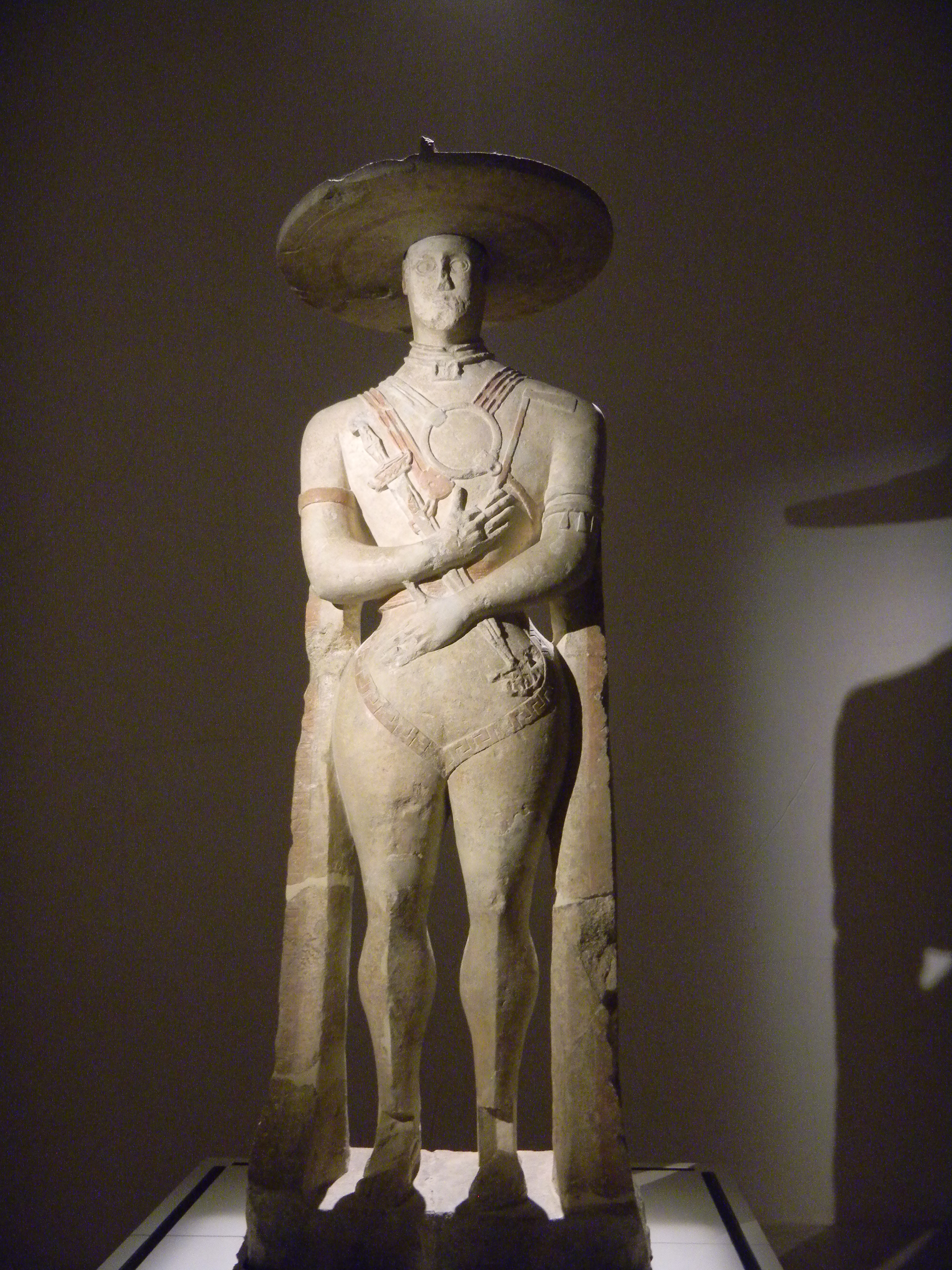
The Warrior of Capestrano

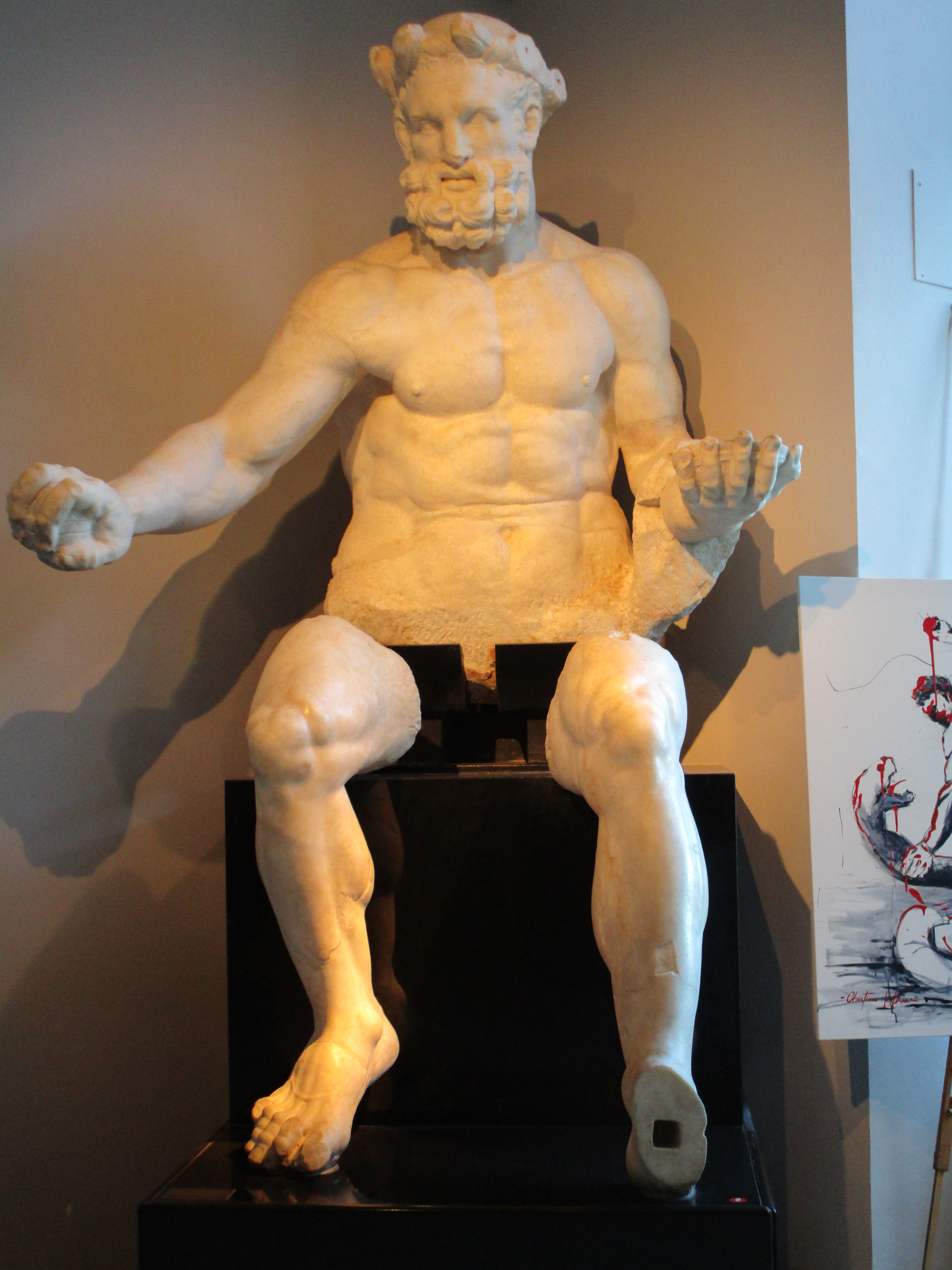
The monumental marble statue of Hercules from Alba Fucens

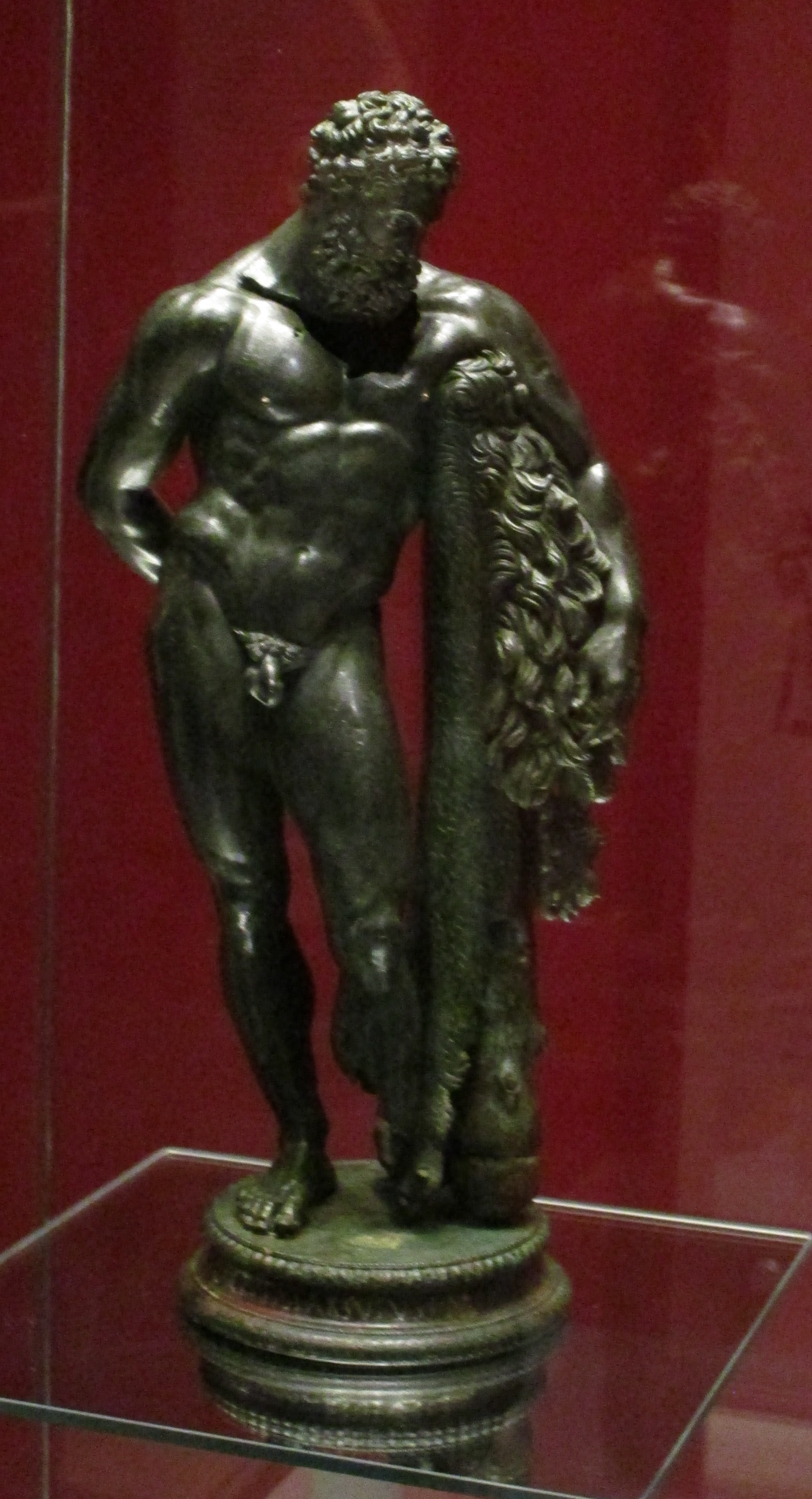
The bronze statue of Hercules from the Shrine of Hercules Curinus

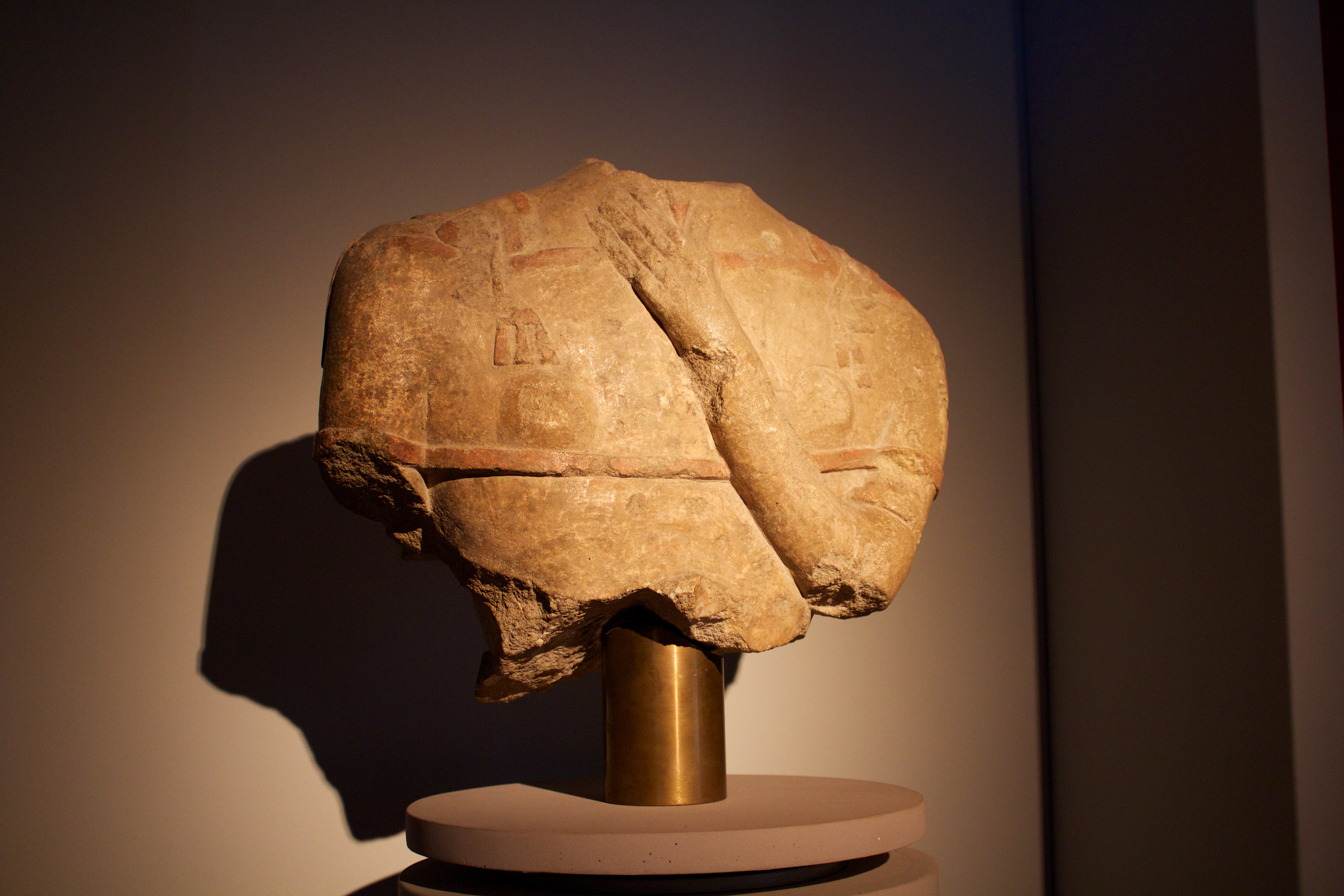
The Lady of Capestrano

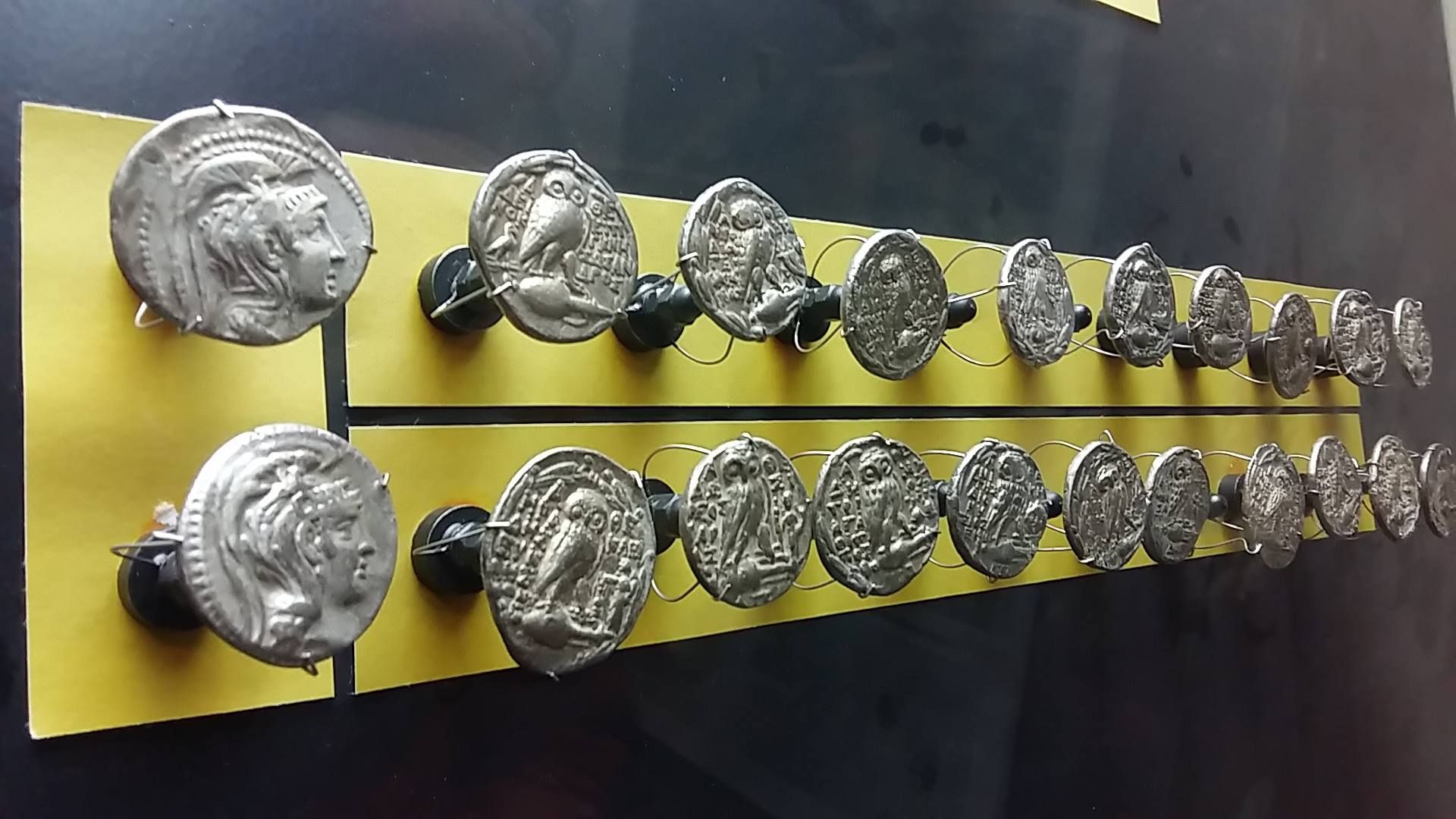
The numismatic collection

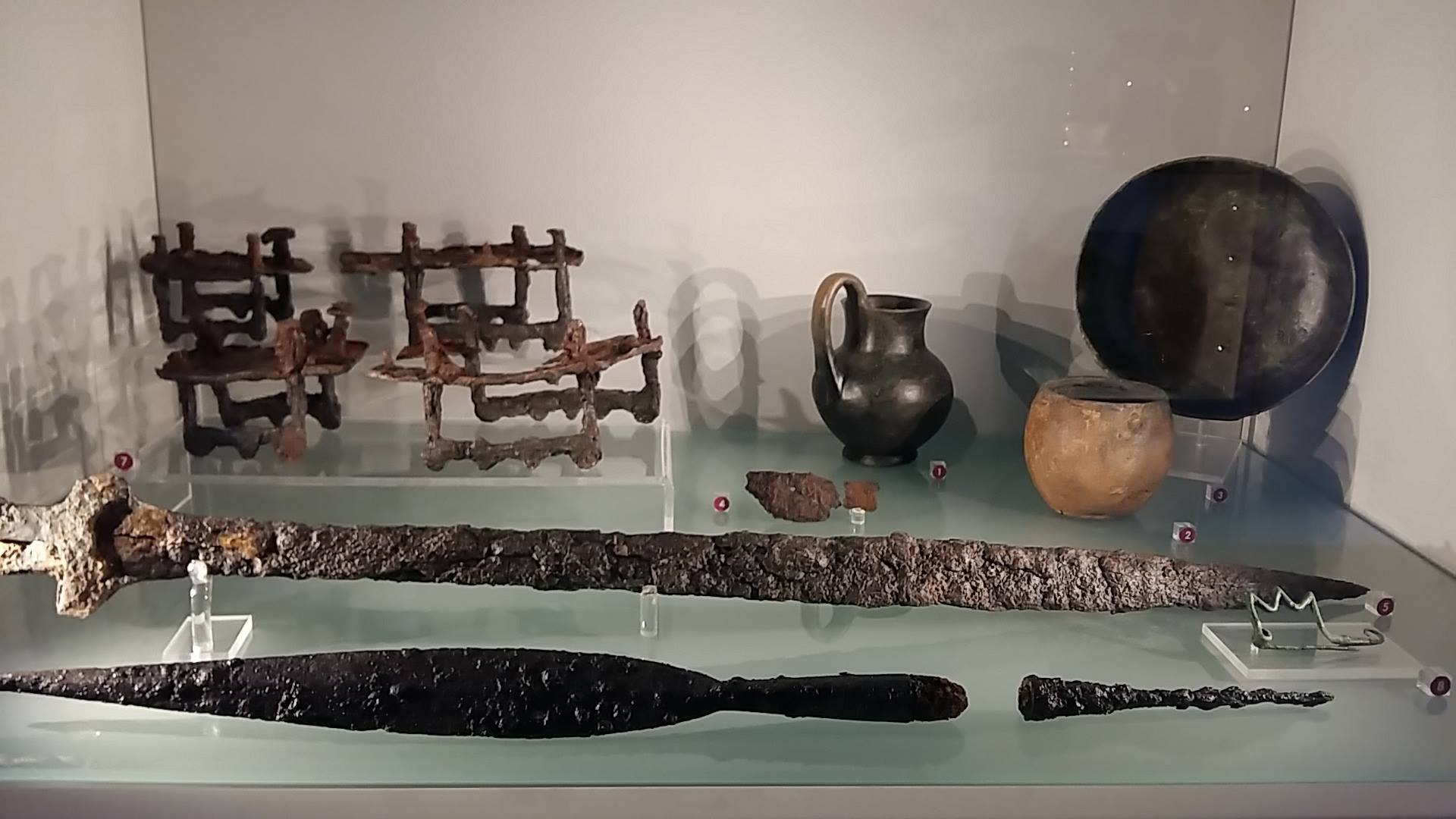
Grave goods dated to the 6th century BC
