= Herk =

Herk may refer to:

== Given name ==
- Herk Harvey (1924-1996), American actor
- Herk Robinson (born 1941), American front office executive in Major League Baseball

== Military ==
- Herk, a nickname of the Lockheed C-130 Hercules military transport aircraft.

== Surname ==
- Big Herk (born 1969), pseudonym of Amery Dennard, American rapper
- Isidore Herk (1882–1944), American burlesque manager

== Places ==
- Herk (river), a small river in Belgium, tributary of the Gete
- Herk-de-Stad, a municipality in Limburg, Belgium

== See also ==
- Van Herk
- Herc (disambiguation)
