= Herakles (disambiguation) =

Herakles is the German spelling of Heracles, the Greek version of Hercules, a legendary figure from Greek mythology

Herakles may also refer to:

== People and characters ==
- Capitano Herakles, a fictional character from the 1952 film 1. April 2000
- Herakles the Dactyl, a legendary figure of Ancient Greek Mythology

== Arts, entertainment, media ==
- Herakles (film), a 1962 short film by Werner Herzog
- Herakles (Euripides), an Athenian tragedy, an Ancient Greek play by Euripides

== Other uses ==
- Herakles Farms, Cameroon; an oil palm plantation
- Herakles, a field hockey team from Liet, Belgium, in the Men's Belgian Hockey League
- Herakles (pusher), a pusher-tug towboat
- Herakles (radar), a PESA radar unit manufactured by Thales
- Opération Héraklès, a 2001 military operation in Afghanistan by French forces

== See also ==
- Hercule (disambiguation)
- Hercules (disambiguation)
- Herkules (disambiguation)
- Heracles (disambiguation)
