= Temple of Hercules =

The Temple of Hercules or Temple of Heracles may refer to:

== Places ==
- Temple of Hercules Victor, or Temple of Hercules Olivarius, in the Forum Boarium in Rome
  - Great Altar of Hercules, the cult center predating the Temple of Hercules Victor
- Temple of Hercules Victor in the Sanctuary of Hercules Victor (Tivoli)
- "Temple of Hercules" (Amman), properly called the Great Temple of Amman (Roman Philadelphia), containing fragments of a monumental sculpture
- Temple of Heracles, Agrigento, in old Akragas in Agrigento, Sicily, Italy
- Temple of Hercules Custos, a lost temple to Hercules the Guardian
- Temple of Hercules Musarum, a lost temple in Rome to Hercules of the Muses
- Temple of Hercules Pompeianus, a lost temple in Rome
- Shrine of Hercules Curinus, in the comune of Sulmona, Italy
- Spartia temple, a temple of Heracles and his mother Alcemene in Sesklo, Greece
