= Iraklis (disambiguation) =

Iraklis (Greek: Ηρακλής) may refer to several sports clubs and other topics in Greece named after the mythological hero Heracles:

- G.S. Iraklis Thessaloniki, a sports club based in Thessaloniki
- Iraklis Larissa, a football club in Larissa
- Iraklis Psachna F.C., a football club in Psachna
- Iraklis (horse), a New Zealand Trotting Cup winning standardbred race horse

== See also ==
- Heracles (disambiguation)
- Hercules (disambiguation)
