= D. hercules =

D. hercules may refer to:

- Dabasa hercules, a butterfly species
- Dynastes hercules, the Hercules beetle, a rhinoceros beetle species native to the rainforests of Central America, South America and the Lesser Antilles

== See also ==
- Hercules (disambiguation)
