= Herkules =

Herkules may refer to:

- Junkers Ju 352 Herkules, a German World War II transport aircraft
- Operation Herkules, a proposed World War II invasion of Malta by the Axis
- Maschinenfabrik Herkules, a German manufacturer of machine tools
- IF Herkules, a Norwegian multi-sports club in Skien, Telemark
- Jerzy Radziwiłł (1480–1541), Polish–Lithuanian nobleman nicknamed "Herkules"
- SMS Herkules, an Austro-Hungarian Navy salvage ship - see List of ships of Austria-Hungary
- Herkules, a type of sonar equipping the Arnala-class corvette
- Herkules, a towboat/museum ship in Västergötland, Gothenburg, Sweden - see List of museum ships
- Herkules, a variety of hop - see List of hop varieties

== See also ==
- Hercule (disambiguation)
- Hercules (disambiguation)
- Heracles (disambiguation)
- Herakles (disambiguation)
