= Sanctuary of Hercules Victor (Tivoli) =

Ancient Roman religious site

- Ercole Vincitore
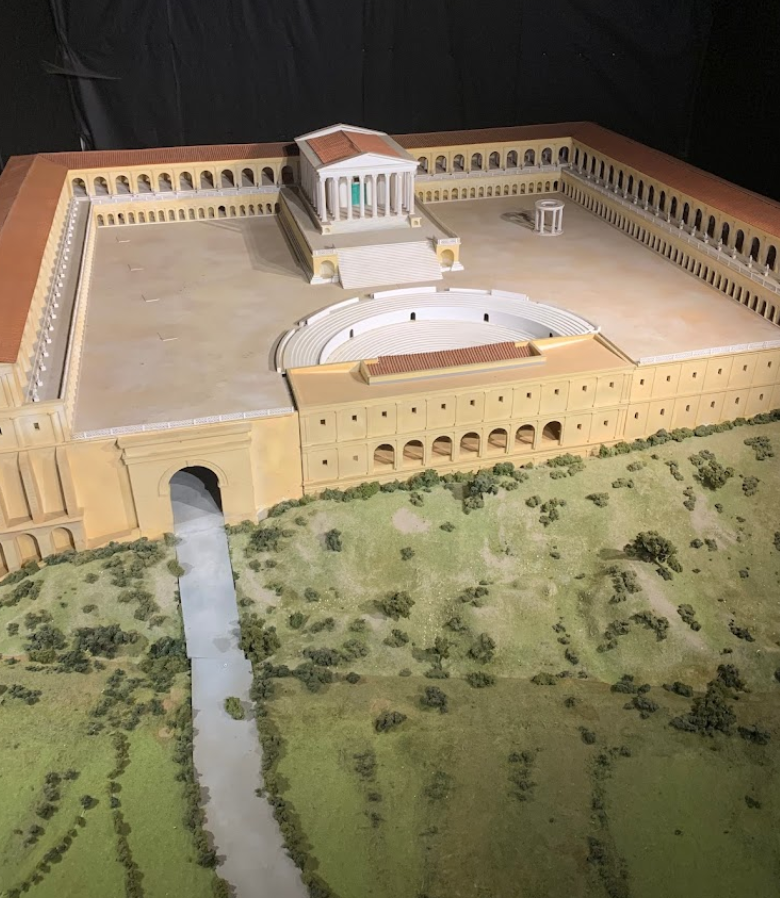
- Model of Sanctuary of Hercules Victor

- Location within Italy
- 41.9634162°N 12.7925378°E
- Type: Religious sanctuary
- Periods: Roman Republic
- Cultures: Ancient Rome
- Location: Tivoli, Metropolitan City of Rome Capital, Lazio, Italy

History
- Built: c. 120-82 BC
- Built by: Romans

Site notes
- Area: Originally 3,000 square metres (32,000 sq ft)
- Website: Sanctuary of Hercules Victor

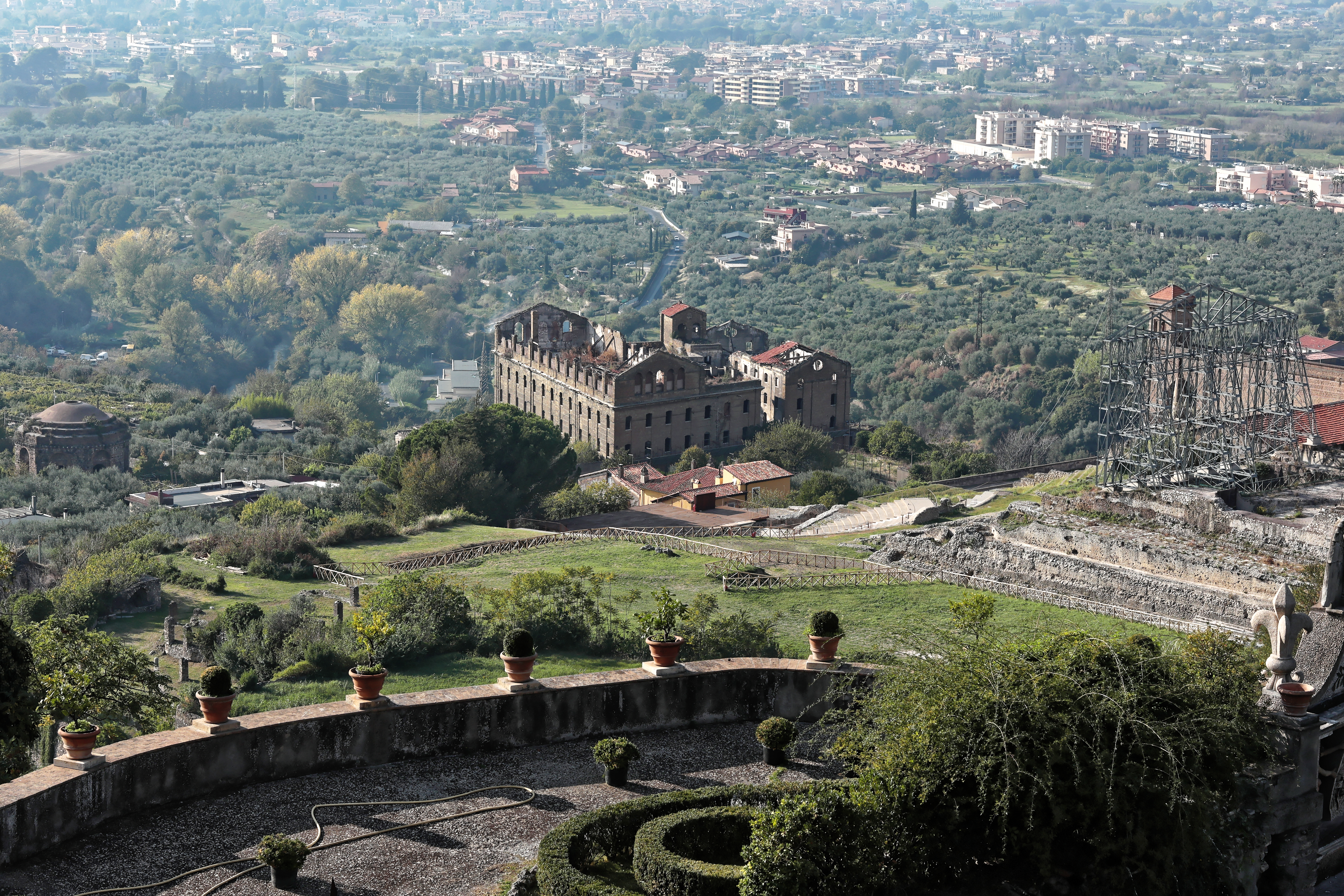
View over sanctuary from Villa D´Este

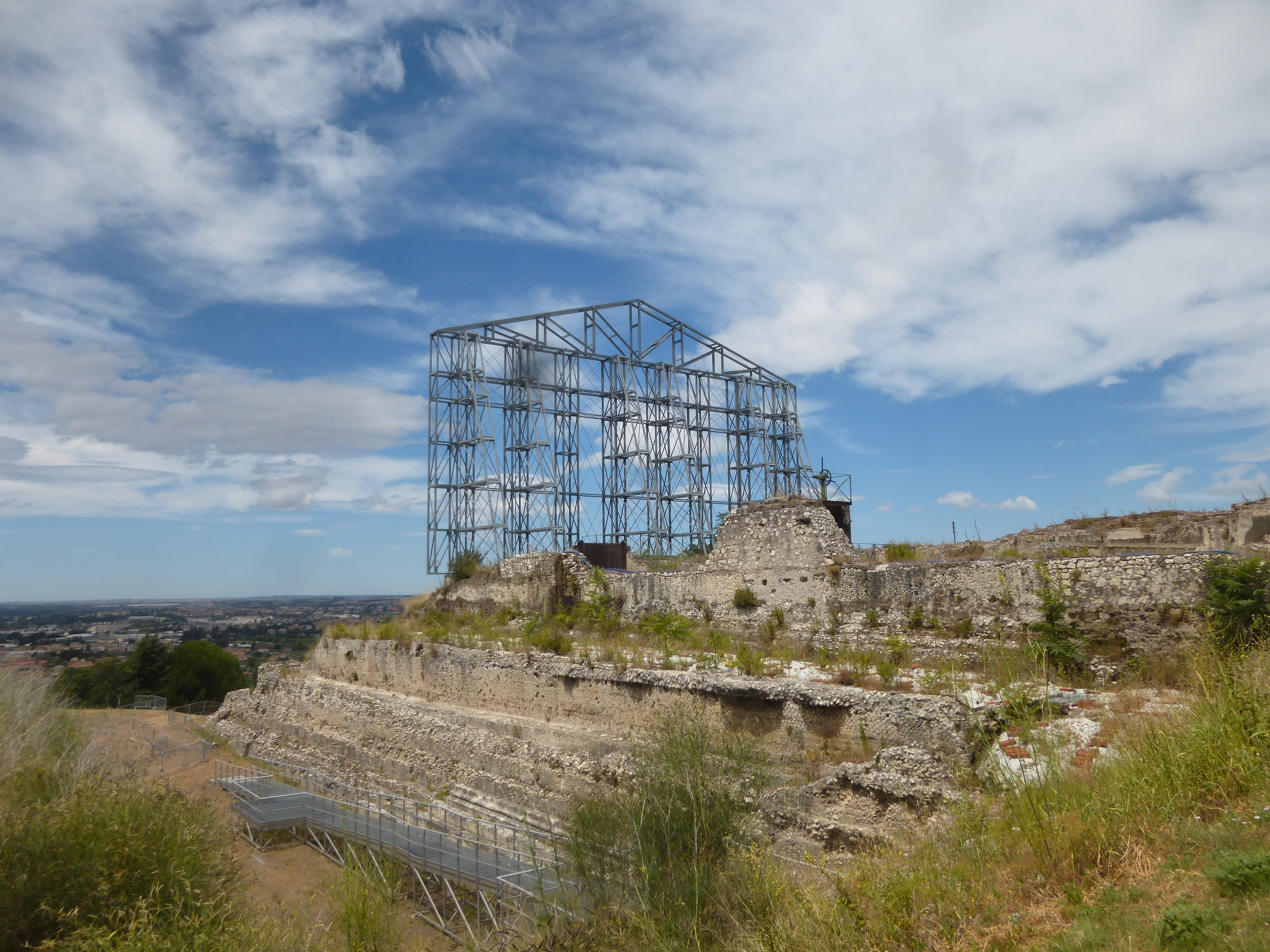
Temple of Hercules Victor

The Sanctuary of Hercules Victor (Italian: Ercole Vincitore) in Tivoli (Italy) was one of the major complexes of the Roman Republican era built on the wave of the Hellenistic cultural influence after the final Roman conquest of Greece (146 BC). It was built just outside the ancient city of Tibur and is the largest of Italic sanctuaries dedicated to Hercules (such as the Shrine of Hercules Curinus), and the second in the whole Mediterranean after that of Cádiz in Spain. It was built between about 120 and 82 BC and was a masterpiece of Roman engineering with many innovations. Further building was done in the Augustan period especially in the theatre area. Augustus administered justice here on numerous occasions, under the arcades of the sanctuary.

The site had been used since the construction of the Villa d'Este in 1570 until 1993 for industry with foundries, followed by nail and screw factories, paper mills, and finally power stations.

In 2008/2009, restoration and enhancement of the sanctuary began, especially of the theatre. The work brought to light part of the original structures and led to the opening of the complex to the public in June 2011.

== History ==
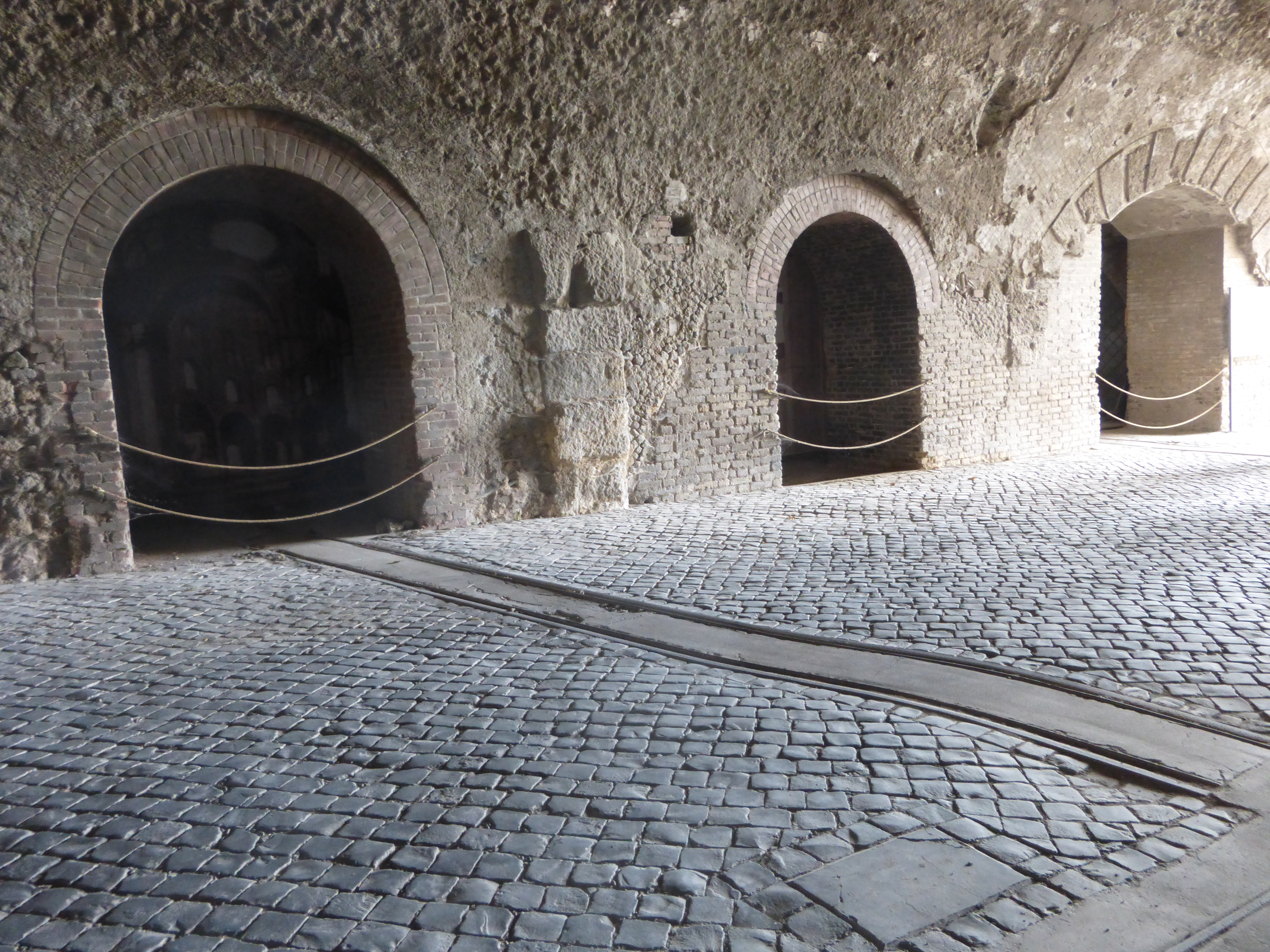
The shops on the south side of the via tecta are from the first phase of the project and were built to overlook an open road of the clivus tiburtinus. Their arched openings with barrel vaulted roofs are much simpler than the sophisticated concrete roofs of the rooms on the opposite side of the street from the second phase

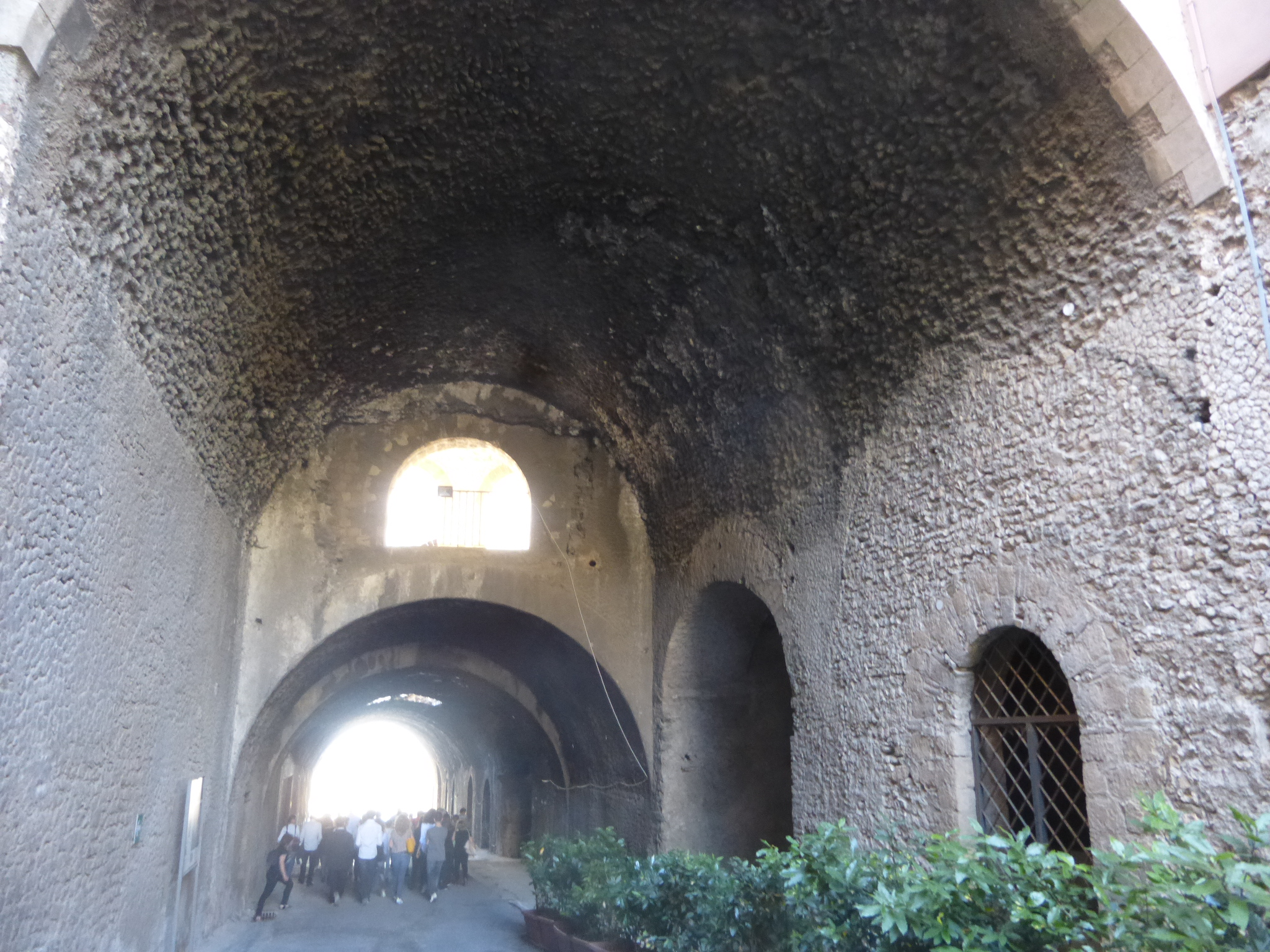
Entrance to the via tecta from the East (on the third level): at the top a window overlooking the lower portico on the fourth level

After the end of the Second Punic War (212 BC), trade in the Roman world surged, and again after the conquest of Greece (146 BC). Perhaps it is no coincidence that the need to build a huge complex outside the walls of Tibur, compared to the size of the city, was born after these events. More specifically the need, in the second phase of construction (in the first decade of the first century BC), to incorporate a road inside the sanctuary can be correlated with the change in Tibur's political status to a Roman Municipium in 87 BC at the end of the Social War, but the need was already clear in previous decades: in fact, both when it was an independent city and when, from the 4th century BC, it had become a Civitas Foederata, Tibur had maintained control of the important trade route and could collect the toll on the bridge (or bridges) of the Aniene located just before the waterfall. But when Tibur became part of the Republic and started to lose its administrative autonomy, it was no longer possible to exercise this type of control, so it was decided to "sanctify" it, eliminating the toll on the bridges and transferring it downstream along Via Tiburtina which, uniquely for a public road of great importance, was made to pass inside the Sanctuary with the covering of the "via tecta" before 89 BC. Here, the toll, in various forms, would be replaced by an offering to the divinity, with the great flow of "tithes" money. In any case, Tibur was increasingly closely linked to the cult of Hercules.

=== Relationship of the sanctuary to the strategic position of Tibur ===
Tibur was located at the head of the Aniene valley where the river falls 160 m into the Roman countryside and which was a pass on the main route for trade and human travel between the Apennine plateaux of Abruzzo and Apulia, rich in cattle, and the fertile Roman Campagna. Aided by fortifications on the surrounding ridges, the pass determined the function and prosperity of the city from the 9th century BC.

Much of this important route is dotted with places of worship of Hercules: from Sulmona to Alba Fucens, from the temples along the upper Aniene valley to those downstream from Tibur at the springs of Aquae Albulae, Settecamini, the area of San Lorenzo, to the Temple of Hercules in Ostia Antica, the terminal station of the salt trade. This is because Hercules was the patron deity of hard work, of loyalty in trade (as in the 10th labour, the capture of the oxen of Geryon, during which the hero "reclaimed" the Forum Boarium from Cacus) and of commercial and financial transactions.

=== The Cult of Hercules ===
Tivoli was identified with the cult of Hercules by virtue of its strategic position and it venerated him as a warrior god (Hercules Victor or Invictus) for a victory over the Aequi, as Hercules Saxanus (as protector of travertine mining), and as protector of trade and of flocks, a fundamental activity for the original city economy.

The cult was one of the most important in Latium and common to many civilisations of the Mediterranean. Unlike the Greek Herakles, revered above all as a semi-god, the Italic Hercules is mainly a deity, protector of all civilising activities related to the centuries of urbanisation (8-7th c. BC), from reclamation to deforestation, regulation of waters, and to businesses with all their implications. He also had the function of chthonic divinity typical of territories rich in wells, sinkholes, and rising springs, such as near Tibur.

As a cult possibly originated in Tivoli, tradition has it that the cult of Hercules Victor was exported to Rome in the late Republican age by the legendary Marcus Octavius Herennius, a wealthy oil merchant, perhaps identifiable with that Herennius who was a musician (tibicinus) and then Magistratus Herculaneus at the Tiburtine sanctuary. He had the circular Temple of Hercules Victor or Invictus (or to Hercules Olivarius) built in the Forum Boarium in Rome.

=== Construction ===
From recent surveys and excavations, the first sanctuary started in the 160's BC had terraces similar to the sanctuary of Fortuna Primigenia in nearby Praeneste, with a trapezoidal plan similar to the temple of Jupiter Anxur in Terracina. A collapse of the structure led to the interruption of the work, which was resumed a few decades later with a completely different plan. In this second phase, the main modifications were:

- The entire rear part of the limestone hill and terrace was levelled by removing an enormous amount of land. In the space created, the theatre was built
- A section of the "clivus tiburtinus" (the last stretch of Via Tiburtina) which, in the original project skirted the side of the complex, was incorporated into a tunnel, the via tecta, which joins the oldest structure to the majestic second phase complex on the north side, whose structures rise more than 40 m from the banks of the Aniene and which is the best preserved part of the sanctuary.

=== Operation and wealth of the Sanctuary ===
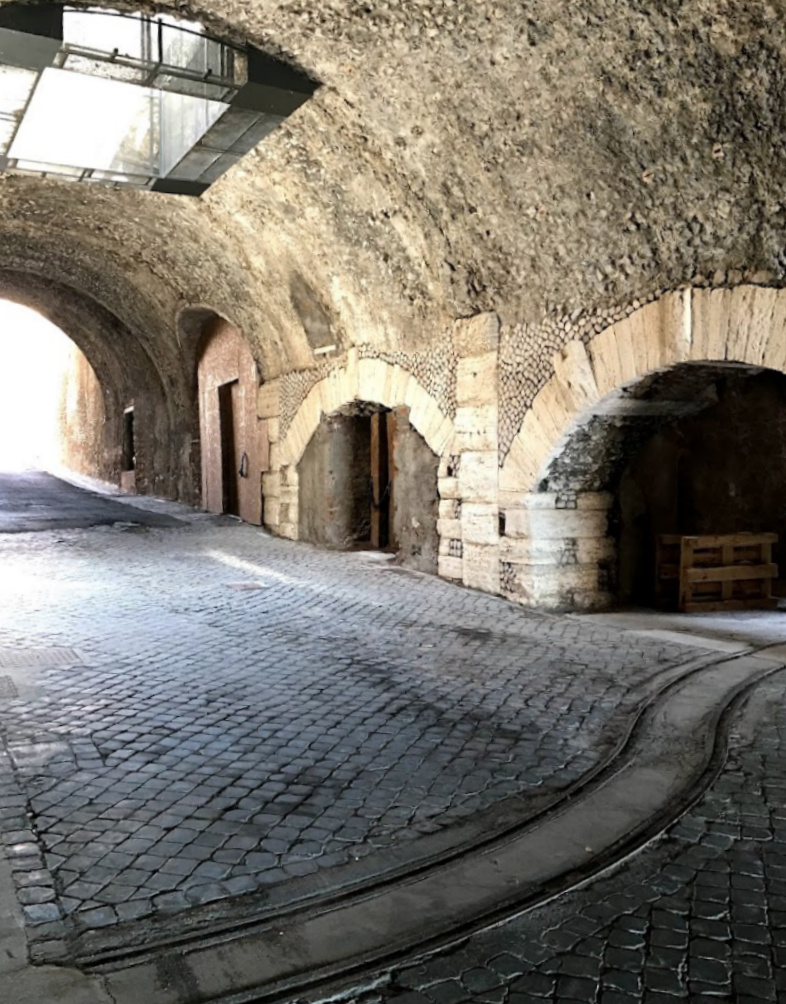
Via tecta

In late republican and imperial times the traffic that crossed the city of Tibur (and therefore the sanctuary) had increased to the point that it was necessary to set up rest and sorting camps for wagons and herds, with related assistance and health control services, upstream and downstream of the bridge (the Roman bridge probably fell in the great flood of 105 AD) which crossed the Aniene near the temples of the Acropolis (also built at the beginning of the splendour of the city, II-I century BC). The rest camps upstream (towards Abruzzo) were probably in Crocetta, about 2 km from the city; those downstream from the clivus tiburtinus almost reached the Lucan bridge. These lands were all owned by the sanctuary.

The sanctuary was also offered the "tithe" of every transaction made within it. The exchanges that took place within it and, therefore, the movement of money or flocks within it were huge. The "tithe" was paid in money or in kind (10% of the flocks). In the latter case, the specialised workers kept the flocks or herds in the large rooms on the north side of the via tecta, reselling them as soon as possible at competitive prices. In addition to this commercial part, the heart of the complex was represented by the Temple. After all, one of the reasons for the numerous constructions of sanctuaries in various cities of Lazio (Tibur, Praenestae, Terracina, Gabii, etc.) and other locations in central Italy was, in fact, to attract pilgrims, who also brought wealth. The pilgrims brought offerings in money and in ex-voto which, often in gold and silver, were periodically removed and melted down, while those in terracotta were crammed into votive pits. Pilgrims needed accommodation and food, or cash loans, and for this the complex offered paid inn services and banking services.

Another source of income for the sanctuary was the thesauri or alms boxes, placed in strategic points at the exits of the city, especially on the paths that allowed travellers not to go through the via tecta to enter or exit Tibur.

Moreover, as the wealth and power of the Sanctuary increased, rich merchants or politicians, senators, proconsuls, generals were keen to make donations, to win the benevolence of the priests and the divinity, because they would be counted among the benefactors of the "fanum", gained prestige, or simply would be remembered.

The wealth accumulated in a few decades meant that Octavian used the treasure of the sanctuary, which was still part of the public treasury, to prepare the army for the battle of Philippi. Nonetheless, the riches of the Tiburtine sanctuary continued to increase, due also to the functions of lending money (which was reserved to the "curator Fani", the only one who could practice usury without committing sacrilege) and to direct commerce, especially the oil trade with the island of Delos, one of the most powerful trading centres in the Mediterranean.

=== Rise and fall ===
The prestige and wealth of the sanctuary reached its peak in the imperial era, probably under Hadrian (117–138 AD), who had his governing palace nearby.

In the 4th century, between the edicts of Milan (313) and of Thessalonica (380), the activity of the sanctuary decreased. The raids throughout the Aniene valley aimed at the destruction of pagan temples and shrines by bands organised by Basilian monks based above the Villa of Nero at Subiaco also wrought damage. The Codex Theodosianus (391–2) stopped all pagan religious activities, even if the civil authorities kept social and organisational activities alive in the sanctuary (local festivals, social and recreational activities, sports, etc.)

In the 5th century, it is probable that looting began, indicated by many statues being hidden, often far from their original location (for example, in the pit of the auleum of the theatre).

During the 5th and 6th centuries, the sanctuary's possessions were taken, usurped, donated, occupied, and eventually became the property of the Tiburtine Church, which, from the 10th century onwards, used the Charta Cornutiana from the 5th century, recently found to be a forgery to claim the right of ownership.

== Layout ==
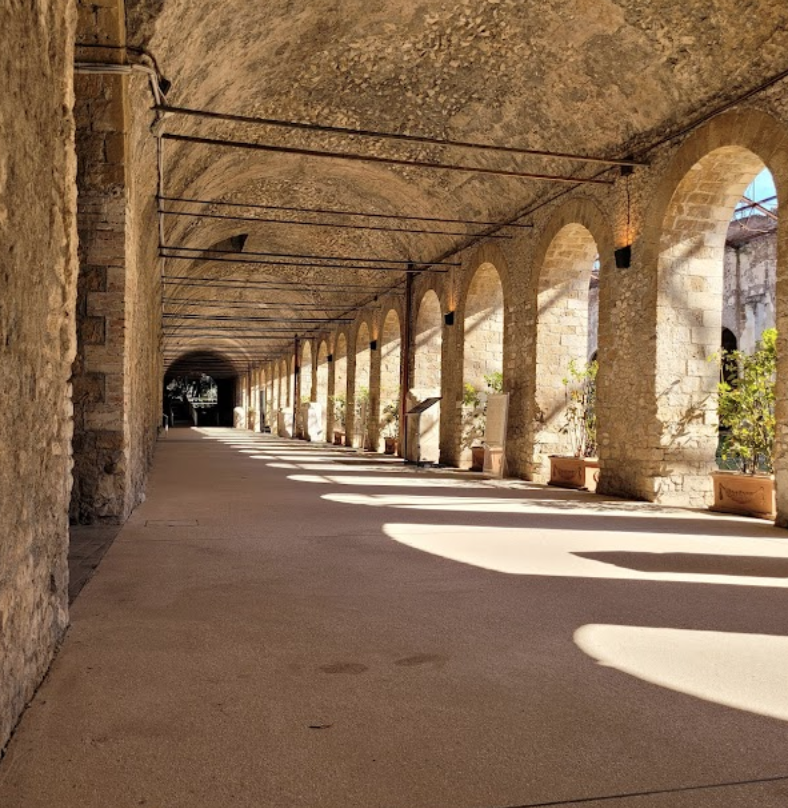
temenos portico

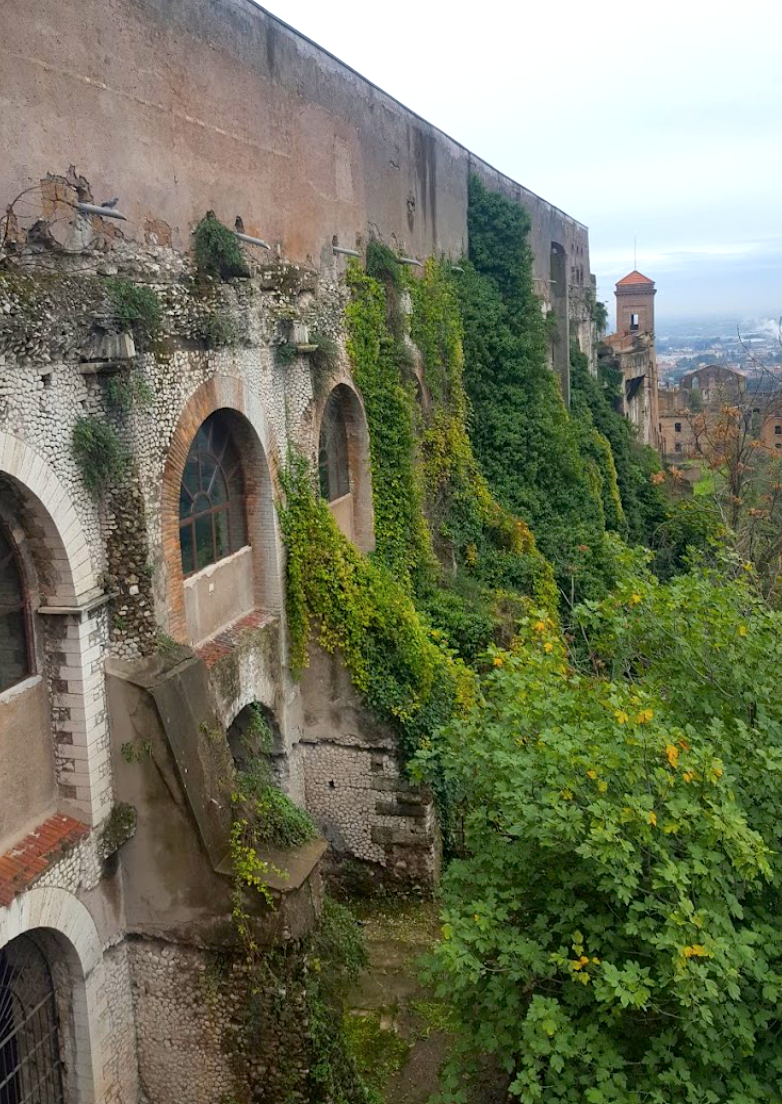
Northern facade

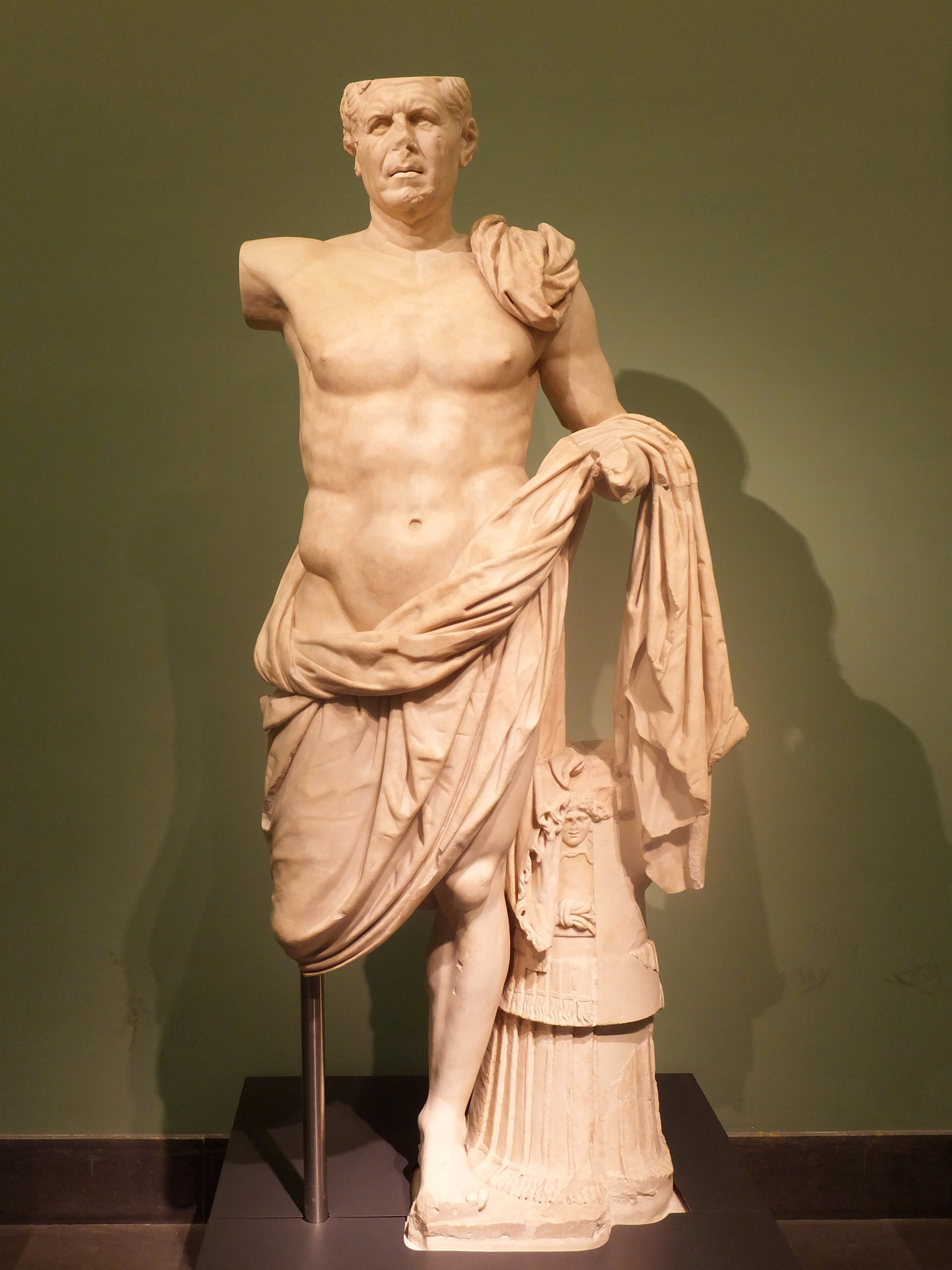
So-called Tivoli General

The sanctuary has many affinities with the nearby contemporary sanctuary of Fortuna Primigenia in Palestrina, with its theatre set on the hill dominated by the sacred square, even if it differs in the size of the temenos, the location of the auditorium of the theatre, the double portico, and the presence of the via tecta.

Like other sanctuaries, it was divided into 3 main parts: a theatre, a temple, and a large colonnaded courtyard. Also, it was structured into two main levels: the underground one, on which the via Tiburtina passed, dedicated to trade, and the upper one to the religious cult of Hercules.

The sanctuary had a rectangular plan (188 x 144 metres), with five floor levels in its deepest northern section, which gradually decrease in the NW-SE direction to two floors in the shallowest part against the limestone bank. The base of the platform, made up of backfill, determined at least in part the survival of parts of the complex, especially the via tecta and the numerous adjacent rooms. Of the via tecta and adjacent rooms, just over 50% remains, as those in the northwest parts have been destroyed.

The via tecta is on the 3rd level from the bottom and crosses the structure diagonally from NE to SW, and the large rooms along its route that overlook the north ridge gradually increase in area.

On the 4th level is the upper forecourt with the temenos, or sacred space on which the temple stood. The temenos was surrounded on three sides by overlapping two-storey porticoes crowded with statues and honorary sculptures of Roman and local benefactors with inscriptions, many of which were found during the excavations at the end of the 19th century (including the famous statue of the General of Tivoli, Lucius Gellius possibly (in the Museum of Palazzo Massimo in Rome) and the inscription of the "Quattuorvirs" who had taken care of the roof of the "via tecta"). About half of the east section of the lower portico is preserved, the one on the long side behind the podium of the temple, and about half of the north side shows a series of arches framed by Doric semi-columns in opus incertum, with travertine capitals and a barrel vault. On the south side are traces of the upper floor, with similar but double-sized arches, with an internal colonnade (so-called duplex portico).

The upper portico, on the other hand, was on the 5th level, slightly set back from the lower one and, compared to the lower one, had almost double-sized arches that opened onto a large terrace with balustrade and barriers. This allowed a walkway of about 550 m, including the walkway that ran on the top of the podium all around the temple, also on the 5th level.

At the rear of the lower and upper porticoes opened other rooms, mostly perfectly preserved, which overlooked the north side with large windows and were connected by internal stairs to the underlying via tecta and to the rooms adjacent to it. These rooms on three levels (third, fourth, and fifth) connected to the via tecta, lower portico, and upper portico, respectively, and were built in opus caementicium. The special feature is the sophisticated structure of the vaults and the unloading arches of the rooms on the third level, those that open onto via tecta, which made it possible to raise the fourth and fifth levels with cantilevered walls, connecting the weight of the structure only with enormous arches in travertine ashlars on the side of the road, two of which are still perfectly preserved. This daring construction technique is one of the elements that suggest different periods for the two sides of the via tecta and is further confirmation of the two-phase construction. The premises were a veritable multifunctional centre: warehouses, stables, trading rooms, inns, lodgings, banks, refectories, guesthouses, schools, colleges, meeting rooms, shops, factories of ex-voto, etc.

In the area facing the southern portico, a circular enclosure was found with a diameter of about 30 m, paved with hydraulic cement. It is probably, according to scholars, a pool for an oracle whose responses were given through the movements of the objects thrown into the spring. This hypothesis is also supported by the fact that the pool was accessed from a special entrance open on the southern side of the Sanctuary and that a passage from Statius and an inscription refer to the oracle.

=== Temple ===
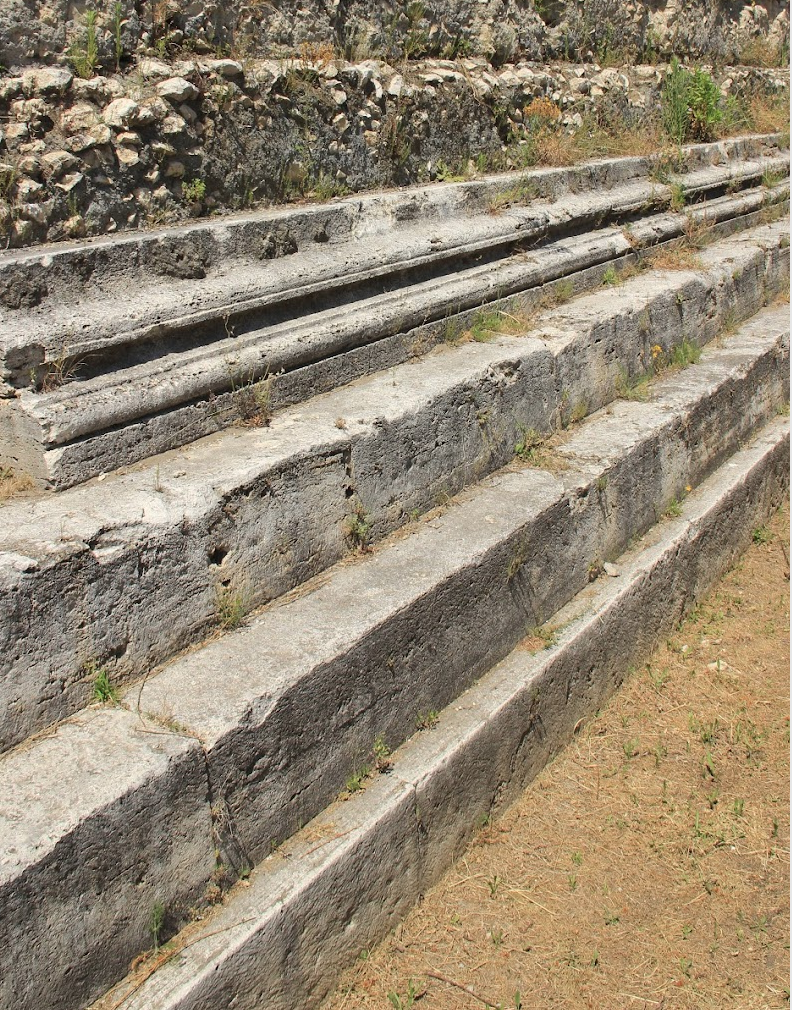
Temple podium travertine covering

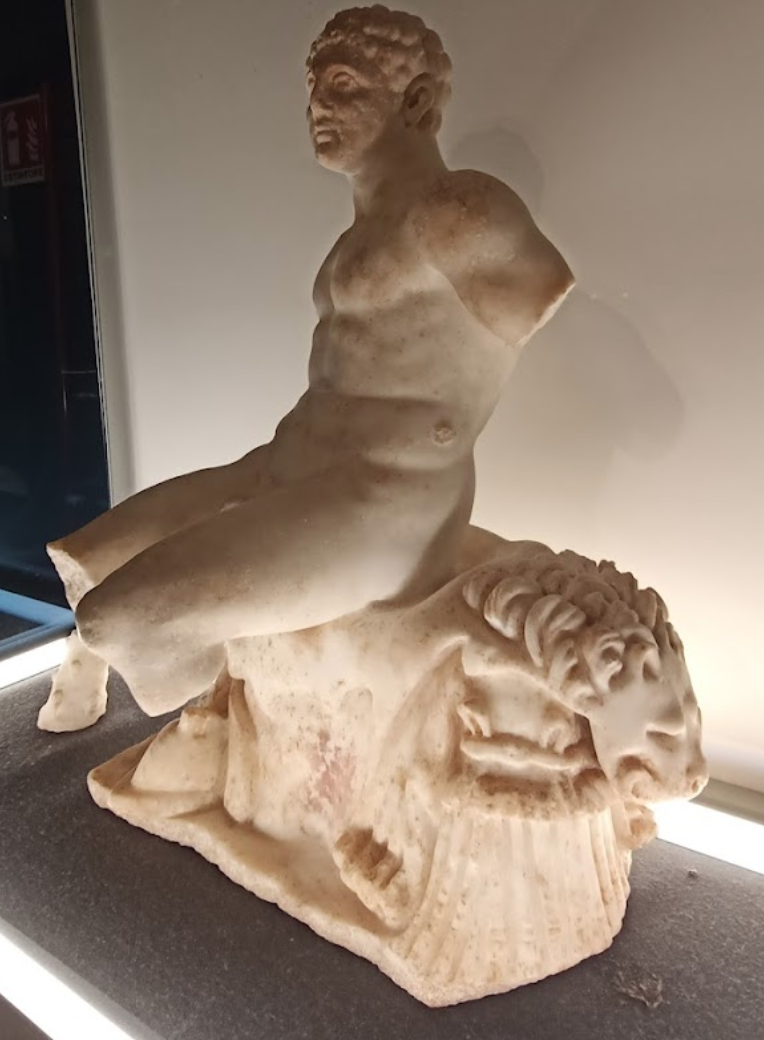
Hercules on lionskin from fountain

At the rear centre of the temenos is the temple with its podium, which is partly preserved only in the southern part. The temple was 18.5 m high and, with its high podium, was 25 m high overall and dominated the landscape; with its gabled roof painted yellow, it was visible from Rome. It is octastyle, "peripteral sine postico" i.e. the cella was surrounded on three sides by a colonnade with eight columns on the main facade and ten on both sides. At the back, an exedra framed the colossal statue of Hercules.

The podium was 6.50 m high and was completely covered on the outside with elegantly molded travertine, as can be seen in the preserved section on the left side of the temple, where steps of travertine, smooth and up to 24 m long, the upper one molded like a frame, make clear the grandeur of the temple. An ancient "thesaurus" (offering box) was also found right next to the base. The two accessible underground rooms of the podium, one of which had an access with a ladder (as can be seen from the reliefs by Thierry of 1863), were perhaps used as a votive deposit and oracular room.

At the front, facing west towards Rome, a staircase with two flights connected the temenos with the temple. On either side of the stairways were monumental fountains (the one on the right was fairly well preserved), inside which was placed a circle of miniature statues of the hero, from which a beautiful statuette remains of young Hercules, portrayed seated on a rock covered with his lion skin.

On the west side, between this staircase and the wall of the theatre opposite, was a space of less than 2 m, unusual for such a large structure, especially in the case of crowding on the temenos, which could occur. This anomaly can be explained by a collapse of the structure, originally shorter and steeper, which forced the builders to reconstruct a longer and shallower staircase over the collapsed part with supporting arches.

=== Theatre ===
The theatre has unusual features: its slope is quite shallow compared to Greek theatres and to that which Vitruvius stated in his De architectura, to the point that some archaeologists have hypothesized that it is not a theatre, but a semicircular staircase that was used to distribute pilgrims along the temenos. But the presence of 3 vomitoria (exits for the spectators), the scaenae frons and the pit of the auleum (the curtain made with fabrics and wooden slats that was lowered at the beginning of the show), as well as the two aditus, the entrances for the public, have dispelled any doubts about it. The anomalous slope is thus explained by the need to build the cavea respecting the two floors that had remained free from landslides, that of the scena (originally the last terrace of the substructure) and that of the temenos and the podium of the temple.
