= Nasako Besingi =

Cameroonian environmental activist

- Born: Cameroon
- Occupations: Environmental activist, farmer
- Employer: Struggle to Economize our Future Environment (SEFE)
- Organization: Struggle to Economize our Future Environment (SEFE)
- Known for: Environmental protection, opposition to the Herakles Farms palm oil project, human rights advocacy
- Awards: TAIGO Non-State Actor Award (2012)

Nasako Besingi is a Cameroonian environmental activist and farmer. He is the Director of the NGO Struggle to Economize our Future Environment (SEFE) located in Mundemba in the Southwest Region, Cameroon.

== Activism and arrests ==
Nasako Besingi has led several protests against the development of palm oil plantations by the Sithe Global Sustainable Oils Cameroon (SGSOC), a local subsidiary of the New York-based agribusiness company Herakles Farms threatening to destroy an area of rainforest. The SGSOC had acquired a 73,086-hectare site on a 99-year land-lease deal through an agreement with the Cameroonian government to develop an industrial palm oil plantation and refinery.

Nasako Besingi was arrested several times for opposing the project.

On November 14, 2012, he was arrested along with four of his collaborators at the premises of SEFE in Mundemba, where a group of over 50 community members were prepared for a peaceful campaign against the company Sithe Global Sustainable Oils Cameroon (SGSOC).

In 2012, he was attacked by a group of people while serving as a guide to a team of television journalists making a documentary about the conflicts between Herakles Farms Company (SGSOC) and communities of the Mundemba. He wrote a report about the incident and was sued for defamation by the company. On 3 November 2015, he was sentenced to pay either pay a fine of 1 million CFA Francs or serve 3 years prison term.

He was again arrested on 25 September 2017 in the headquarters of his NGO in Mundemba by a large group of police. His passport, documents, phones and computers were seized. He was charged for and charged with insurrection and terrorism. He was detained in jail for two months. On 27 November 2017, the Examining Military Judge in Buea, Cameroon dropped all charges against him and signed the release order.

== Awards ==
- 2012: TAIGO non-state actor award by the Citizens Governance Initiatives
