= Béa Ercolini =

Belgian journalist

Béa_Ercolini
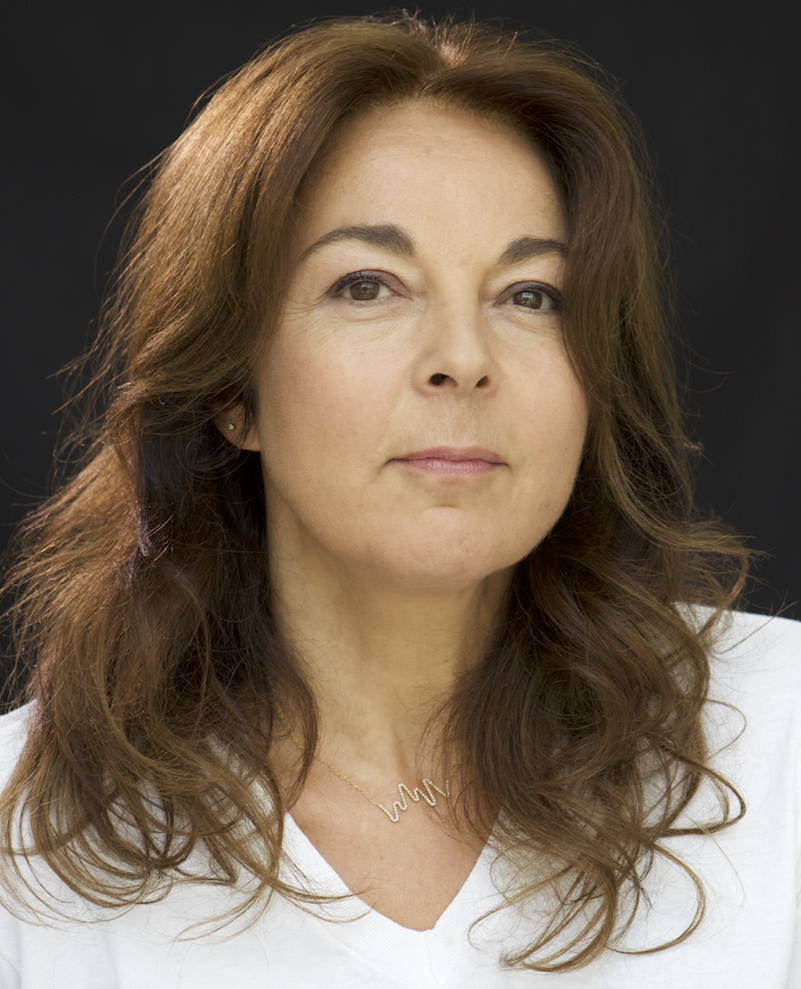
- Ercolini in 2020
- Born: 1963 (age 62–63); Aiseau-Presles
- Education: Université libre de Bruxelles
- Occupations: Journalist, activist, not-for-profit entrepreneur

Béa Ercolini (born 1963) is a Belgian multimedia journalist, activist and not-for-profit entrepreneur. She was the editor-in-chief of the Belgian edition of ELLE from 2003 to 2016. A committed feminist, Béa Ercolini has been called upon by the media to reflect on the roles and place of women in the public space. She combines several activities. Founding director of a women's business club, Beabee enabling women to expand their professional network, she is a consultant, mentor and keynote speaker.

== Biography ==
Born in 1963 in Aiseau-Presles, she studied History of art at the Université libre de Bruxelles. In 2003, she was the founder and editor un chief of the Belgian version of the magazine ELLE. In 2008, she became head of editorial teams, a position she held until October 2016. In 2019, she ran as an independent candidate supporting women's rights for the Humanist Democratic Centre list in Brussels for the Federal Parliament.

== Activism ==
Interviewing historian Florence Montreynaud, she realized the lack of role models for girls and the absence of women in History as it is written. Another book, witness to violence against women, upsets her: it's A Woman in Berlin, a testimony that has long remained anonymous.

In 2012, impressed by the freedom of speech caused by Sofie Peters' film Woman in the Street, led her to create a campaign against street harassment entitled "Touche pas A Ma Pote". The campaign will become a non profit. As founders, she regularly speaks out to denounce the existence of the phenomenon of street harassment and sexism in general The non-profit organization is setting up information and awareness sessions on sexist harassment in public spaces for pupils of 5th and 6th grade, then secondary (14.500+ today).
