= Ercole dei Fedeli =

Italian goldsmith

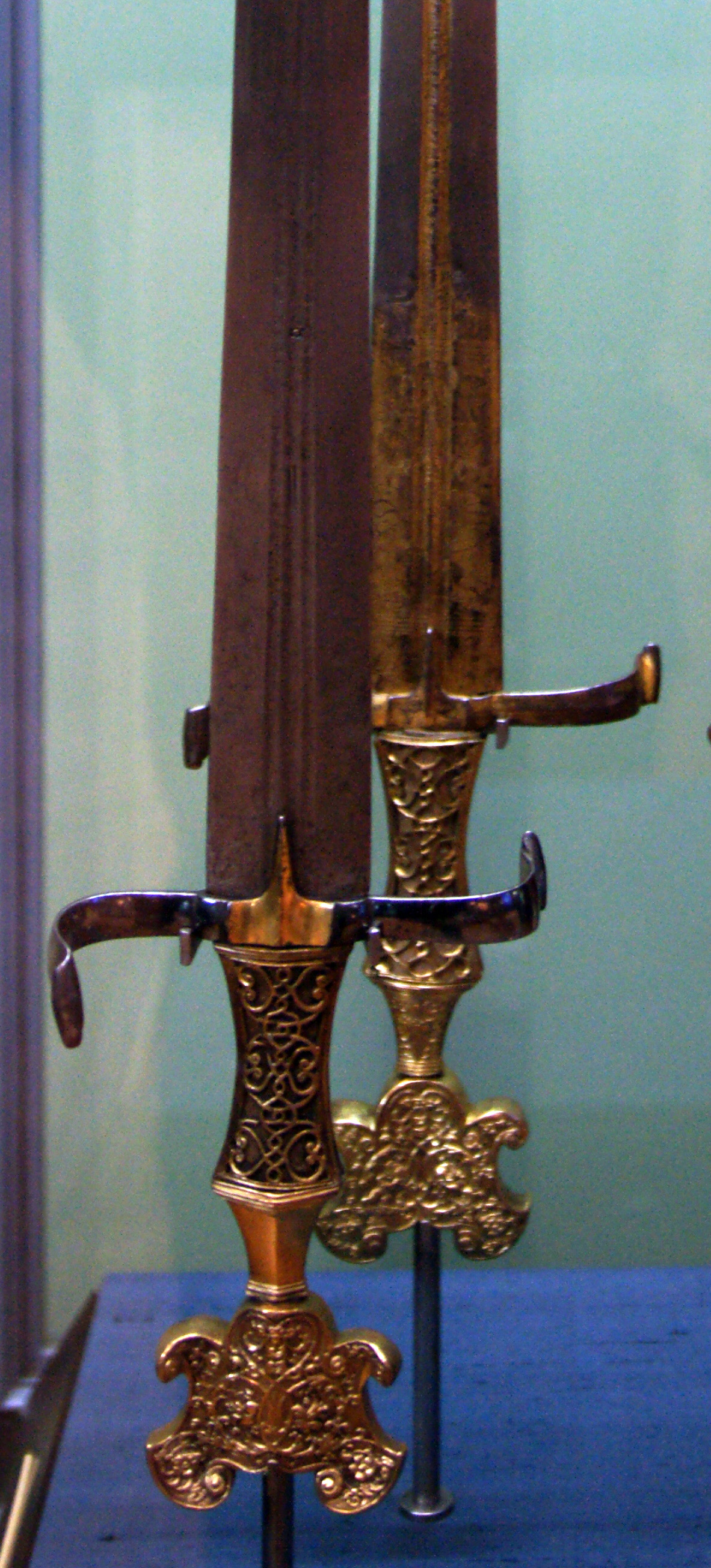
Engraved hilts and blades by Ercole dei Fedeli, 1509

Ercole dei Fedeli (born c. 1465 as Salomone da Sesso, died c. 1504–21) was an Italian goldsmith and master sword engraver. His name has also been recorded as Ercole da Ferrara, da Sesso, dei Fidelis, de Fedeli or de Fedelis.

== Life ==
Born and raised in the Jewish tradition, he worked as a goldsmith in Ferrara, including for Eleanor of Naples, Duchess of Ferrara. After his forced conversion to Christianity between March and November 1491, he assumed the name "Ercole dei Fedeli" ("Hercules of the Faithful"), married a woman named Eleanor and fathered several children.

In 1504 he is last recorded as working for Isabella d'Este, the wife of Francesco II Gonzaga and duchess of Mantua. A petition from 1521 by his wife and children, which does not name him, makes it appear likely that he had died by then.

== Work ==
Ercole is known principally for his work as a sword engraver, as few of his other works have remained. His engravings are characterized by framing architectural arches, a great sense of movement in figurative scenes, and a very light, technically flawless stroke.

Charles Émile Yriarte (1891) and some later scholars attributed almost all Italian cinquedeas of his period to Ercole, an attribution that now appears dubious. The works now attributed to him with some certainty are:

- the cinquedea of Cesare Borgia (now at the Casa Caetani in Rome) and its scabbard (Victoria and Albert Museum in London, no. M 101.1869)
- a cinquedea in Brescia (Museo Marzoli, no. 727)
- a cinquedea in Florence (Stibbert Museum, no. 3593)
- a cinquedea in London (Royal Armouries, no. IX.146)
- a sword in Paris (Musée national du Moyen Âge, no. CL 11811)
- three swords in Vienna (Kunsthistorisches Museum, nos. A453–A455)
- a rapier in St. Petersburg (Hermitage Museum, no. B410)

== Works on Ercole dei Fedeli ==
- Herzig, Tamar (2019). A Convert's Tale: Art, Crime, and Jewish Apostasy in Renaissance Italy. Harvard University Press. ISBN 9780674237537.
