= Italian tugboat Ercole =

History

Italy
- Name: Ercole
- Namesake: Ercole
- Builder: Damen shipyard in Gdynia (Poland)
- Launched: 2002
- Acquired: 2013
- Commissioned: - October 2002 Levanto Secondo; - 18 June 2014 Ercole Y 430
- In service: 1
- Home port: Taranto
- Identification: IMO number: 9257979; MMSI number: 247079600; Callsign: IHEZ; Pennant number: Y 430
- Status: Active

General characteristics
- Type: Coastal tugboat
- Displacement: 540 t (530 long tons) full load
- Length: 28.67 m (94 ft 1 in) LOA
- Beam: 10.43 m (34 ft 3 in)
- Propulsion: - 2 x diesel engines Wärtsilä 9L20C, 1,620 kW (2,170 hp) each; - 2 x Voith propellers
- Notes: towing fixed point: 52.5 t (51.7 long tons)

Ercole (Y 430) is a coastal tugboat of the Marina Militare.

== History ==
Ercole is a tugboat designed on Damen Azimuth Stern Drive Tug 2810 plans. It was built at Damen Shipyards in Gdynia, Poland, and delivered to Italian maritime operator Rimorchiatori Riuniti Spezzini at La Spezia, in October 2002, and named Levanto Secondo. In 2013, it was sold to Agenzia Industrie Difesa (Defence Factories Agency) for service with the Marina Militare. Ercole was updated at the Arsenale militare marittimo di Messina with new Voith propellers.
