= HERC1 =

Protein-coding gene in the species Homo sapiens

Identifiers
- Aliases: HERC1, p532, p619, HECT and RLD domain containing E3 ubiquitin protein ligase family member 1, MDFPMR
- External IDs: OMIM: 605109; MGI: 2384589; GeneCards: HERC1
Available structures
PDB	Human UniProt search: PDBe RCSB
PDB	List of PDB id codes 4O2W, 4QT6
Enzyme activity
EC #	BRENDA	ExPASy	KEGG	MetaCyc
2.3.2.26	↗	↗	↗	↗

Gene location (Human)
Chr.	Chromosome 15 (human)
Band	15q22.31	Start	63,608,618 bp
Band	15q22.31	End	63,833,948 bp

Gene location (Mouse)
Chr.	Chromosome 9 (mouse)
Band	9|9 C	Start	66,257,732 bp
Band	9|9 C	End	66,416,057 bp
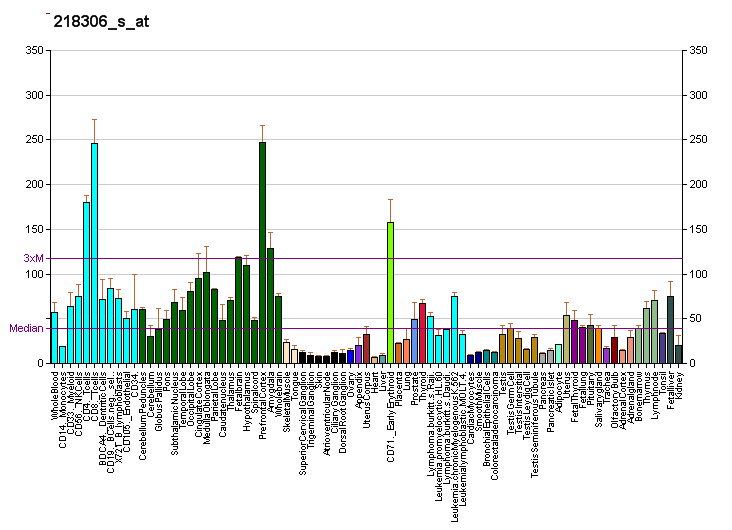
RNA expression pattern
Bgee	Human / Mouse (ortholog); Top expressed in: middle temporal gyrus; Brodmann area 23; ganglionic eminence; right hemisphere of cerebellum; primary visual cortex; prefrontal cortex; Achilles tendon; Skeletal muscle tissue of biceps brachii; muscle of thigh; right frontal lobe / Top expressed in: perirhinal cortex; CA3 field; cingulate gyrus; entorhinal cortex; medial dorsal nucleus; primary motor cortex; cerebellar vermis; medullary collecting duct; lobe of cerebellum; habenula; More reference expression data
BioGPS	More reference expression data
Gene ontology
Molecular function	ubiquitin-protein transferase activity; guanyl-nucleotide exchange factor activity; transferase activity
Cellular component	cytoplasm; cytosol; Golgi apparatus; membrane
Biological process	cerebellar Purkinje cell differentiation; negative regulation of autophagy; neuron projection development; protein ubiquitination; neuromuscular process controlling balance
Sources:Amigo / QuickGO
Orthologs
Databases	NCBI: entry; OMA: entry
Species	Human	Mouse
Entrez	8925	235439
Ensembl	ENSG00000103657	ENSMUSG00000038664
UniProt	Q15751	n/a
RefSeq (mRNA)	NM_003922	NM_145617
RefSeq (protein)	NP_003913	n/a
Location (UCSC)	Chr 15: 63.61 – 63.83 Mb	Chr 9: 66.26 – 66.42 Mb
PubMed search
- Wikidata
View/Edit Human	View/Edit Mouse

Probable E3 ubiquitin-protein ligase HERC1 is an enzyme that in humans is encoded by the HERC1 gene.

The protein encoded by this gene stimulates guanine nucleotide exchange on ARF1 and Rab proteins. This protein is thought to be involved in membrane transport processes

Knowledge of the gene is facilitated by the discovery of a mouse mutation. The tambaleante (tbl) mutation arose spontaneously on the DW/J-Pas genetic background, a recessive mutation of the Herc1 gene located on mouse chromosome 9 that increases Herc1 protein levels. This protein is largely expressed in many tissues (Sanchez-Tena et al., 2016; https://www.proteinatlas.org/ENSG00000103657-HERC1/tissue) and multiple brain regions including the cerebellum (https://www.proteinatlas.org/ENSG00000103657-HERC1/brain).

Herc1-tbl (tambaleante) mutant mice are characterized by Purkinje cell loss. In addition to the cerebellum, Herc1tbl mutants had lower dendritic spine widths in CA1 pyramidal neurons. Herc1-tbl mutant mice are also characterized by cerebellar ataxia, an unstable gait, and a limb-flexion reflex triggered by tail lifting seen in other cerebellar mutants, the reverse of the normal limb extensor reflex.

Relative to wild-type mice, Herc1-tbl mutant mice fell sooner and more often from a rotarod, fell sooner from a vertical pole, slipped more often and took more time to reach the end of a stationary beam, and had weaker forelimb grip strength measured by a grip strength meter. The rotarod deficit was rescued when Herc1tbl mutants were bred with transgenic mice expressing normal human HERC1. Herc1tbl mutants were also less adept at landing correctly on all four legs when released in the air.

Biallelic HERC1 mutations were reported in two siblings with facial dysmorphism, macrocephaly, motor development delay, ataxic gait, hypotonia, and intellectual disability. Likewise, a nonsense HERC1 variant was reported in one subject with an autosomal recessive condition consisting of facial dysmorphism, macrocephaly, epilepsy, motor development delay, cerebellar atrophy, and intellectual disability. Facial dysmorphism, macrocephaly, and intellectual disability but without cerebellar ataxia were also reported in two siblings with a HERC1 splice variant mutation. The lack of cerebellar involvement was ascribed either to the nature of the mutation or the influence of modifier genes. Another patient with a frameshift HERC1 mutation predicted to truncate the protein displayed facial dysmorphism, macrocephaly, epileptiform discharges, hypotonia, intellectual disability, and autistic features.
