= Hercules PSU =

Brand of power supplies for turntables

Hercules is the de facto brand name of a range of substitute, or 'upgrade,' power supplies for audiophile turntables that use a synchronous motor.

A single design of PCB (printed circuit board) provides crystal oscillator regulated power for both 33⅓ rpm and 45 rpm operation, and is offered with a choice of enclosures and installation kits to suit different makes and models of turntable, such as the Linn Sondek LP12, as well as certain models from Rega, Thorens, and others.

The so-called "Mose" enclosure is claimed to provide a sound quality enhancement to the standard power supply, and is offered with either an integrated or separate control switch.

The products are designed by Edmund Chan, and have been produced in Hong Kong since 2006.
