= Kylie Hercules =

Falkland Islands politician (born 1989)

Kylie Marie Hercules, MLC (born 5 October 1989) is a politician and former prison officer and social worker from the island of Saint Helena, part of the British overseas territory of Saint Helena, Ascension and Tristan da Cunha.

== Career ==
Born on 5 October 1989, Hercules attended the Prince Andrew School on Saint Helena. She left school in 2005 with a diploma in social care and worked in retail until 2007 when she became an operator at Cable and Wireless. She worked in the Falkland Islands for Sodexo between 2008 and 2009 when she returned to Saint Helena, eventually as a Social Care Officer. In 2011, she became a Police Constable and two years later became a Senior Prison Officer and Offender Manager in the prison service. For eight months in 2013 and 2014 she was acting Deputy Prison Manager and in 2015 worked as an Offender Manager before resigning later in the year. In 2016, she took on a managerial role with Saint Helena National Trust and in September of that year became a Lay Advocate. In the Saint Helena general election of 2017, Hercules was elected to the island's Legislative Council. She subsequently became a member of the Council's Social and Community Development and Health Committees, as well as the St Helena Fisheries Corporation Board, ESH Finance Governance and Audit Sub-Committee and the Community College Board; she also became Deputy Chair of the Education Committee.
