= Albulae Aquae =

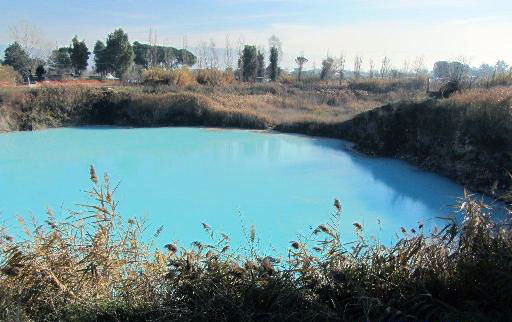
- Aquae Albulae - The thermal spring Queen's Lake (Lago della Regina)

- Location within Italy
- 41.966805°N 12.720499°E
- Type: Roman Imperial
- Periods: Augustan period
- Location: Tivoli

History
- Built by: Unknown builder

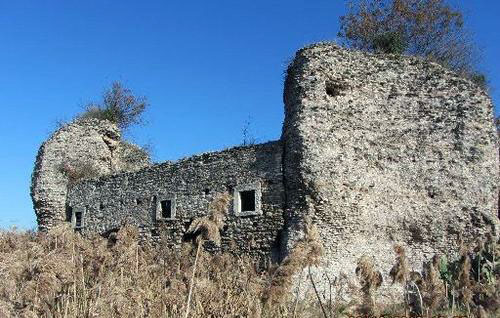
Roman baths

Albulae Aquae ("White Waters") is a group of springs located 6 kilometres (3.7 mi) west of Tivoli, Italy and about 21 kilometres (13 mi) from Rome city center. Its Latin name derives from the ancient Roman settlement here.

The spring water is bluish, strongly impregnated with sulphur and carbonate of lime, and rises at a temperature of about 24 °C (75 °F). The principal spring, the "Lago della Regina", is continually diminishing in size owing to deposits left by the water. Dedicatory inscriptions in honour of the waters have been found at the site. The deposits form travertine stone which is still mined for building material.

The remains of Roman thermal baths are nearby, which used the thermal springs. They are locally known as the baths of Queen Zenobia as she lived in a villa nearby after she was brought back from Palmyra in 274.

It is mentioned briefly by many ancient authors, among them, Virgil, Vitruvius, Isidore of Seville, and Pliny the Elder:

Iuxta Romam Albulae aquae volneribus medentur, egelidae hae,
sed Cutiliae in Sabinis gelidissimae suctu quodam corpora invadunt,
ut prope morsus videri possit, aptissimae stomacho, nervis, universo corpori.

The tepid waters of Albula, near Rome, have a healing effect upon wounds.
Those of Cutilia, again, in the Sabine territory, are intensely cold, and by a kind of suction penetrate
the body to such a degree as to have the effect of a mordent almost. They are remarkably beneficial for affections of the stomach, sinews, and all parts of the body, in fact.
