= Herakles Farms =

American agribusiness company

Herakles Farms, formerly known as SG Sustainable Oils, is an American company active in oil palm plantations and timber business. Its headquarters are in New York City. According to its web site, it claims to be committed to sustainability.

== Activity in Cameroon ==
The presence of Herakles Farms in Cameroon started in 2009. Sithe Global Sustainable Oils Cameroon (SGSOC) is a Cameroonian subsidiary of Herakles Farms, has received a concession of 73,000 hectares of rainforest to be replaced by oil palm plantations in 2009. This was suspended by the government of Cameroon in May 2013. Herakles Farms claims to invest 300 billion francs CFA and improve the life of indigenous persons of the area. Far more locals are opposed to than in favor of this project. SCSOC has frequently used intimidation and corruption, especially against leaders and key decision makers in the community as well as civil society activists such as Nasako Besingi who was arrested and later sued for defamation of the company. A court in Limbe, Cameroon has condemned Herakles to a fine of 4.6 million for racist discrimination in January 2014. The rainforest mentioned is habitat of the Nigeria-Cameroon chimpanzee and the drill.
