= Heracles (disambiguation) =

Heracles is the Greek version of Hercules, a legendary figure from Greek mythology.

Heracles may also refer to:

== People and characters ==
- Héracles (born 1992), Brazilian soccer player
- Heracles of Macedon, illegitimate son of Alexander the Great
- Heraclidae, the mythical descendants of the legendary Greek hero Heracles
- Heracles Kynagidas, the Macedonian patron god of the hunt
- Heracles Algethi (ヘラクレス星座のアルゲティ, Herakuresu no Arugeti), a fictional character from the anime-manga franchise Saint Seiya
- Heracles, a fictional character from the Japanese anime TV show High School DxD Hero

== Places ==
- 5143 Heracles (1991 VL), the asteroid Heracles, a near-Earth binary asteroid, the 5143rd asteroid registered
- Heracles Peninsula, Crimea; a headland in the Black Sea controlled by Russia

== Other uses ==
- Heracles Almelo, a Dutch football club
- Heracles General Cement, a Greek cement manufacturer
- Heracles, a fictional superweapon from James Bond; see List of James Bond villains
- Heracles inexpectatus, an extinct New Zealand giant parrot
- HERACLES (spacecraft), a planned Moon mission
- Mission Héraclès, a 2001 French Navy mission to support the NATO-Afghanistan War

== See also ==
- Heracles in popular culture
- Hercle, a figure from Etruscan mythology
- Hercule
- Hercules (disambiguation)
- Herkules
- Herakles (disambiguation)
- Iraklis (disambiguation)
