= Ercole Calvi =

Italian painter (1824–1900)

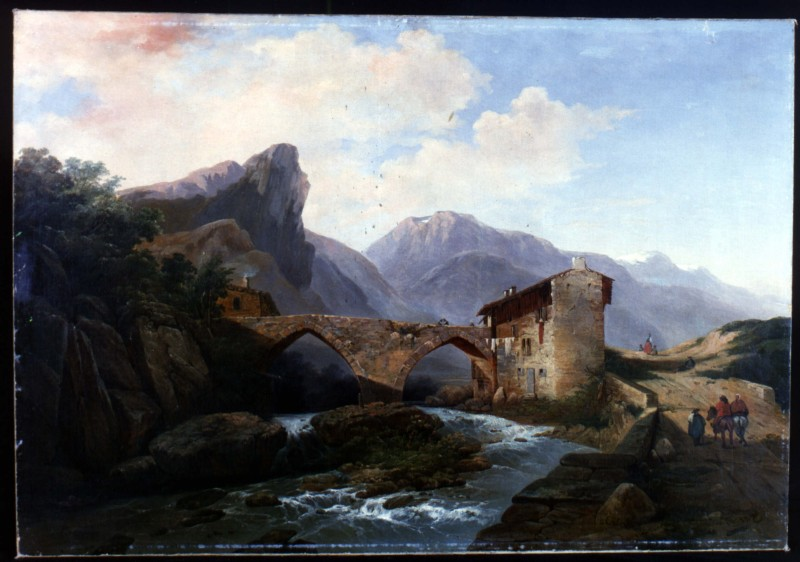
Veduta della Brianza, 1865 (Art collections of Fondazione Cariplo)

Ercole Calvi (1824 in Verona – 1900) was an Italian painter.

== Biography ==
Calvi attended the Cignaroli Academy in Verona before moving to Milan in 1844 and completing his studies at the Brera. Carrying on the Romantic tradition of landscape painting, he made a name for himself at Milanese exhibitions with views of lakes and the area of Brianza based on the then fashionable models of Giuseppe Canella. Calvi’s return to Verona in 1856 was followed by increased commercial success and official recognition. He was appointed professor at the Academy of Fine Arts in 1859 and director of the Società di Belle Arti in 1866.

Urban views, landscapes and subjects drawn from the struggle for national liberation came to predominate in his output in the 1860s. While the adoption of a repetitive and somewhat facile pictorial vocabulary ensured lasting success in terms of sales, the first negative reviews by critics also began to appear in the next decade. The second half of the 1870s saw a determined effort to catch up with the contemporary developments in pictorial realism and the introduction of new subjects drawn from life studies of the Venetian lagoon.

== Other projects ==
Media related to Ercole Calvi at Wikimedia Commons
