= Hercules Gas Engine Company =

Defunct American motor vehicle manufacturer

Logo of the Hercules Gas Engine Company

The Hercules Gas engine company was a United States-based company which first produced buggies. It later was one of the top producers of gasoline engines, including to power cement mixers.

The company was founded in 1902, in Cincinnati, Ohio. Before the company ceased operations in 1934 during the Great Depression, it was one of the top producers of gas engines.

Hercules produced engines to power cement mixers of the Jaeger Machine Company of Columbus, Ohio. Gas engines manufactured by the Hercules Engine Company were branded with the name "Jaeger".
