= Florence Montreynaud =

French feminist (born 1948)

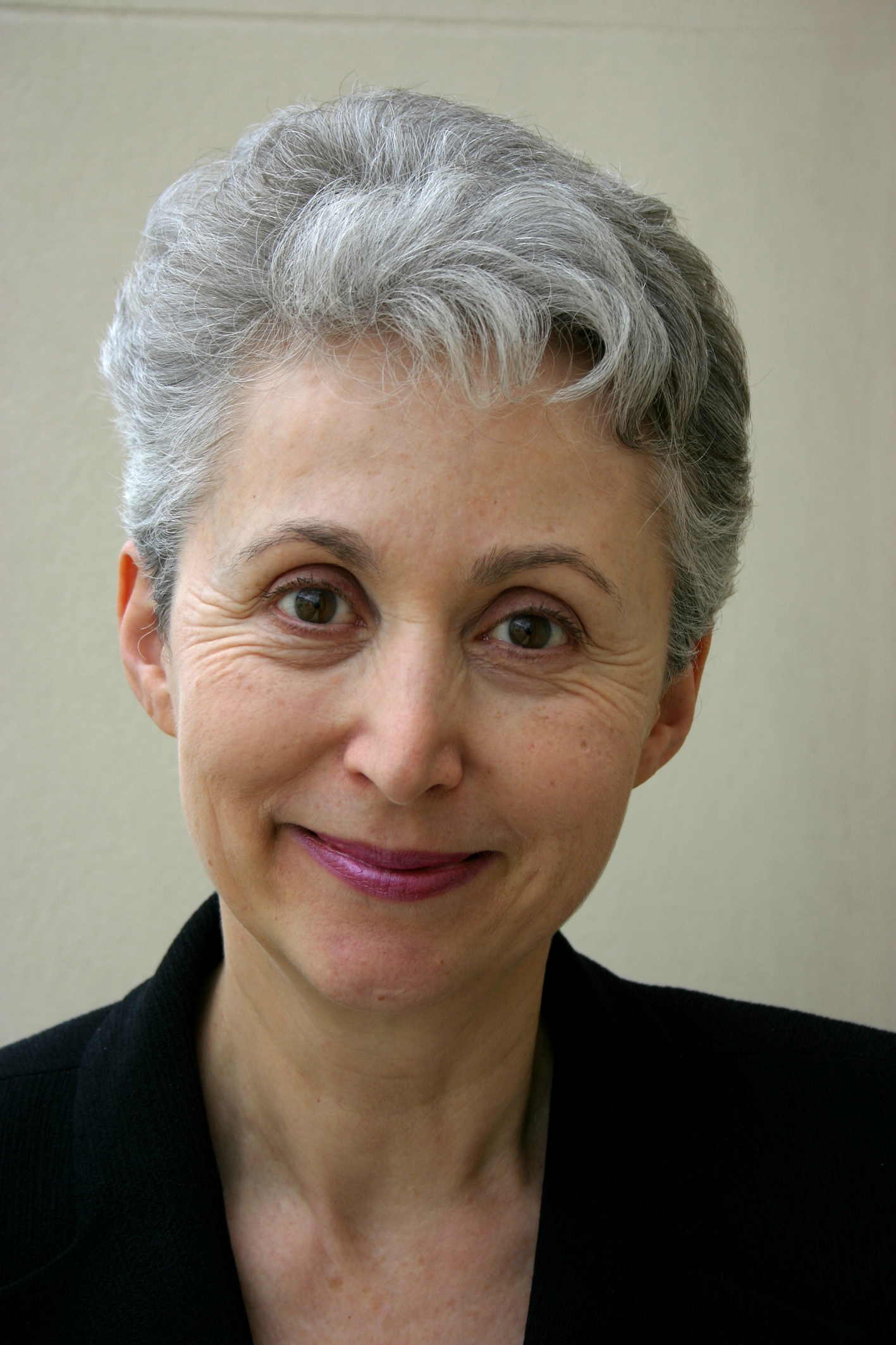
- Born: 1948 (age 77–78)

Florence Montreynaud (born 1948) is a French feminist.

== Biography ==
Montreynaud was born in 1948. Her mother was a painter and her father was an engineer. She currently lives in Paris, and previously lived in the department of Oise. In 1970 she gained a diploma from the Paris Institute of Political Studies after gaining a degree and master's in Russian.

In 1971, she joined the Women's Liberation Movement and Family Planning in Paris. She launched the petition which led to the opening of the Family Planning Centre in Senlis. She participates in many conversations regarding sexuality in lycées and universities with Family Planning.
