= Hercule =

Hercule may refer to:

== Fictional characters ==
- Hercules, in Roman mythology
- Hercule Poirot, a detective created by Agatha Christie
  - Hercule Poirat, a supporting character in the Geronimo Stilton book series, inspired by Poirot
- Hercule Flambeau, in the Father Brown mysteries by G. K. Chesterton
- Hercule (Dragon Ball) or Mr. Satan, in the Dragon Ball franchise
- Hercule, from the comic book Pif et Hercule

== People ==
- Hercule, Duke of Montbazon (1568–1654), French peer
- Hercule Audiffret (1603-1659), French orator and religious writer
- Hercule Corbineau (1780–1823), French soldier
- Hercule Dupré (1844–1927), Canadian farmer, lumber merchant, and political figure
- Hercule Mériadec, Duke of Rohan-Rohan (1669–1749)
- Hercule Mériadec, Prince of Guéméné (1688–1757)
- Hercule Nicolet (1801–1872), Swiss lithographer, natural history illustrator, librarian, and entomologist
- Hercule de Serre (1776–1824), French soldier, lawyer, and politician
- Hercule-Louis Turinetti, marquis of Prié (1658–1726), Dutch noble

== Other uses ==
- Hercule (film), a 1938 French comedy film
- French ship Hercule, nineteen ships of the French Navy
  - Hercule-class ship of the line, led by the Hercule of 1836
- Hercule (hydrogen balloon), a 1795 observation balloon, companion to L'Intrépide, used by the Compagnie d'Aérostiers (French Aerostatic Corps)

== See also ==
- Hercules (disambiguation)
- Herkules (disambiguation)
- Heracles (disambiguation)
- Herakles (disambiguation)
- Ercole (disambiguation)
