= Health eResearch Centre =

English research centre

The Health eResearch Centre is a digital-health network directed by Professor John Ainsworth, that provides research and education across Northern England and beyond.

Based at the University of Manchester and incorporating data-intensive health research from the universities of Bradford, Lancaster, Liverpool, and York, the Health eResearch Centre (HeRC) has one principal aim: to improve public health and healthcare services through informatics research and digital health innovation.

== Research and development ==
The centre delivers over 40 eHealth projects that aim to advance science's understanding of specific diseases alongside providing methodological blueprints on how to conduct health data research. Projects are grouped broadly into the following six themes:

- Endotype Discovery. By combining clinical and genetic data researchers are able to understand more about the root cause of individual diseases leading to more specific and effective treatments. This work enables a shift towards more patient-centered and personalised models of care.
- Efficient Trials. An efficient trial is a multi-disciplinary theme that is developing solutions to help streamline the way that research is designed and conducted, evidence generated and findings translated. This work is helping to speed up the pace of progress in the NHS.
- Actionable Healthcare Analytics. Through the development of virtual health 'bots' with the ability to scan patients' medical records and identify potential opportunities to improve their care investigators at the Health eResearch Centre are making important inroads in improving early disease detection and improving care standards.
- Health eRecord Discovery Science. By linking data from different services with information from other sources allows HeRC researchers to build a more comprehensive picture of specific diseases and how different disease areas - like cancer and type 2 diabetes develop and interact with each other.
- Co-produced Health. The digital revolution is allowing patients to take more control of their health by generating quantifiable data through mobile devices. By using disruptive technology and theory to create real-time feedback loops between patient and professional to improve self-managed care.
- eInfrastructure. Health data science requires considerable computing power and a huge upgrade in the North of England's digital infrastructure.

== Across the UK ==
The Health eResearch Centre is one of four publicly funded eResearch centres of excellence that together make up The Farr Institute of Health Informatics Research.

The network is also building capacity and funding projects in health informatics research.

The Farr Institute provides the physical and electronic infrastructure to facilitate collaboration across the four bodies, led by the universities of Dundee, Manchester, Swansea and UCL, and supports the safe use of research and patients' data for medical research.
