= Hercules (dwarf galaxy) =

Dwarf spheroidal galaxy in the constellation Hercules

Hercules Dwarf Galaxy
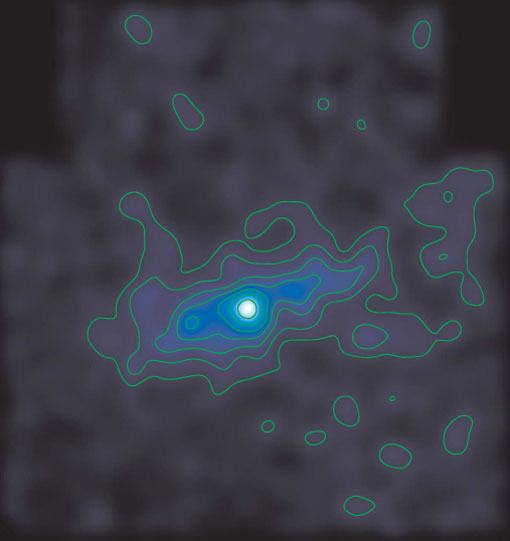
- Hercules, showing its elongated shape

Observation data (J2000 epoch)
- Constellation: Hercules
- Right ascension: 16^{h} 31^{m} 02^{s}
- Declination: +12° 47′ 30″
- Distance: 479^{+26}_{−23} kly (147^{+8}_{−7} kpc), 430^{+20}_{−20} kly (133^{+6}_{−6} kpc)
- Apparent magnitude (V): 14.7 ± 0.5

Characteristics
- Type: dSph
- Apparent size (V): 16.8′
- Half-light radius (physical): 704 ± 65 ly (216 ± 20 pc)
- Half-light radius (apparent): 5.83 ± 0.65′

Other designations
- Her, PGC 4713560

Hercules, or Her, is a dwarf spheroidal galaxy situated in the constellation Hercules and discovered in 2006 in data obtained by the Sloan Digital Sky Survey. The galaxy is located at a distance of about 140 kpc from the Sun and moves away from the Sun with a velocity of about 45 km/s. It is classified as a dwarf spheroidal galaxy (dSph). It has a noticeably elongated (ratio of axes ~ 3:1) shape with a half-light radius of about 350 pc. (Note: From other sources the half-radius is around 230 pc.) The cause of this elongation is under debate. Some studies have found a gradient of velocities across the galaxy's body and a faint stellar stream associated with the galaxy, suggesting that the elongation may be caused by tidal forces acting from the Milky Way galaxy. However, other studies failed to find a velocity gradient or an associated stellar stream, suggesting that it is not being tidally disrupted.

Her is one of the smallest and faintest satellites of the Milky Way—its integrated luminosity is about 30,000 times that of the Sun (absolute visible magnitude of about −6.6), (Note: From other sources the absolute magnitude is around −5.3.) which is comparable to the luminosity of a typical globular cluster. However, its total mass is about 7 million solar masses, which means the galaxy's mass to light ratio is around 330. A high mass to light ratio implies that Her is dominated by dark matter. (Note: It is difficult to estimate the mass of such faint galaxies due to significant foreground contamination, which inflates the velocity dispersion. A paper published in 2009 arrived at a lower mass estimate of about 2 million solar masses within the half-radius; the total mass within 433 pc was estimated at 4 million solar masses.)

The stellar population of Her consists mainly of old stars formed more than 12 billion years ago. The metallicity of these old stars is also very low at [Fe/H] ≈ −2.58 ± 0.51, (Note: From other sources the metallicity is around −2.3.) which means that they contain 400 times less heavy elements than the Sun. The stars of Her were probably among the first stars to form in the Universe. Currently there is no star formation in Her. Measurements have so far failed to detect neutral hydrogen in it—the upper limit is 466 solar masses.
