= Van Herk =

Van Herk is a surname. Notable people with the surname include:

- Aritha Van Herk (born 1954), Canadian writer, critic, editor, educator, and professor
- Gerard van Herk, Canadian musician and linguist

== See also ==
- 1752 van Herk, a main-belt asteroid
