= Hercules (Bulgarian company) =

Bulgarian automobile manufacturer

Hercules was the first Bulgarian commercial vehicle manufacturer.

== History ==
Hercules was founded by Peter Georgieff Spassoff (b. 1886, d.1967). Georgieff was a successful importer of vehicles and a manufacturer of carriages. The brands he imported included International Harvester, Krupp, Adler, Triumph. He was the owner of a carriage assembly factory in Asparuhovo, adjacent to Varna's commercial port. Georgieff entered into a partnership with two brothers, Anastas and Panayot Ilchev, who imported vehicles from the United States. The Bratya Ilchevi Partnership was registered in 1926 at the Varna District Court. It was later terminated, by a court ruling in 1940, which followed an application by the partners to dissolve the partnership.

Together, Georgieff and Ilchevi established Hercules by expanding Georgieff's carriage factory. They equipped the factory with tools and machinery required for the production of trucks, buses and bus bodyworks, funded by Bratya Ilchevi. Georgieff continued to run the expanded factory.

The first bus was produced by Hercules in 1938 and operated on the bus line between Varna and Suvorovo. It had 12 seats. Hercules buses were exhibited at trade fairs in Varna and Plovdiv and sold throughout Bulgaria.

Hercules also had a sales office in Sofia.

Following the communist coup in September 1944, the Hercules factory was nationalised.
