= Hercules (vehicles) =

Hercules (Greek: Ηρακλής) was a Greek manufacturer of agricultural machinery based in Kerkyra (Corfu). It also produced light vehicles categorized as "farm equipment" according to Greek law, including light all-terrain vehicles. The latter used Namco parts and Mitsubishi, Kubota and Ruggerini engines. Small numbers of the particular type were produced between 1980 and 1983.
