= Shrine of Hercules Curinus =

- Santuario di Ercole Curino
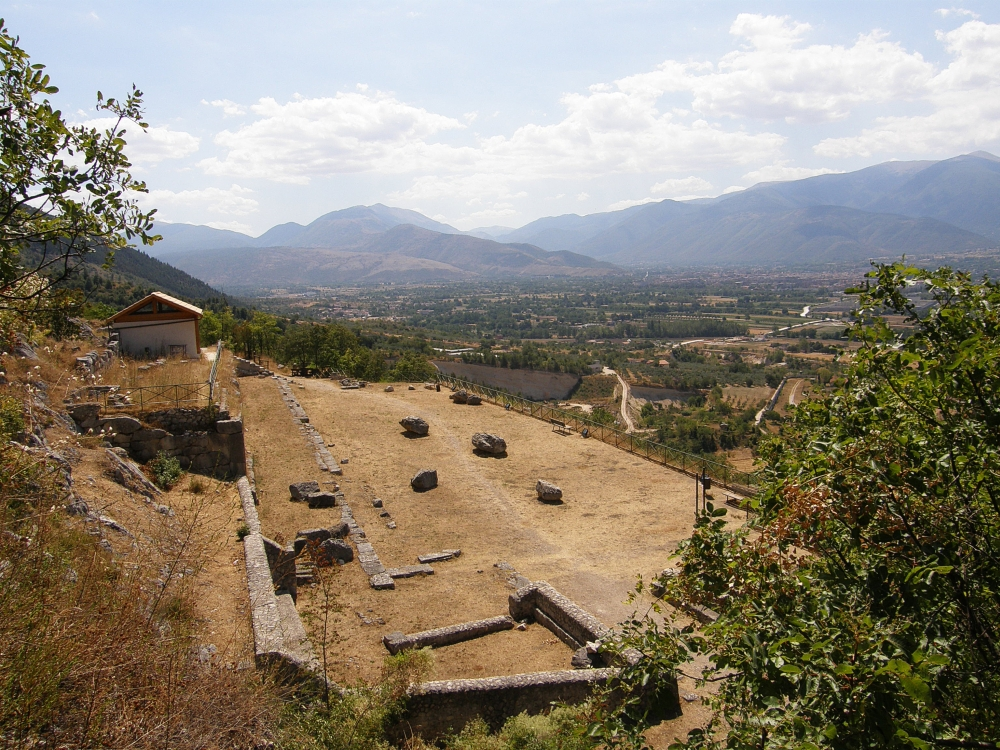
- View of the sanctuary

- Location within Abruzzo
- 42.088539°N 13.934617°E
- Type: Temple
- Cultures: Ancient Rome
- Location: Sulmona
- Region: Abruzzo

The sanctuary or Shrine of Hercules Curinus was an Italic and later Roman sanctuary, the ruins of which are located in the comune of Sulmona, in the province of L'Aquila in the Abruzzo region of Italy.

The epithet of Curinus or Quirinus was also given to other deities in the Republican era, such as Jupiter Quirinus of Superaequum. The Romans linked the epithet "Quirinus" with the deified Romulus, symbol of the unity of the protohistoric communities that formed the primitive settlement of Rome (Quirinus is the origin of curia).

An expansion of the sanctuary dates to the end of the social war (89 BC), when it was enlarged passing from a structure of a local nature to a large sanctuary on terraces similar to the sanctuary of Fortuna Primigenia in Palestrina or the Sanctuary of Hercules Victor in Tibur, built in same period.

The upper part of the sanctuary was buried by an ancient landslide towards the 2nd century AD. The attendance of the site did not stop completely, as evidenced by the addition of a church in the Christian era, close to the southern stairway.

== Description ==
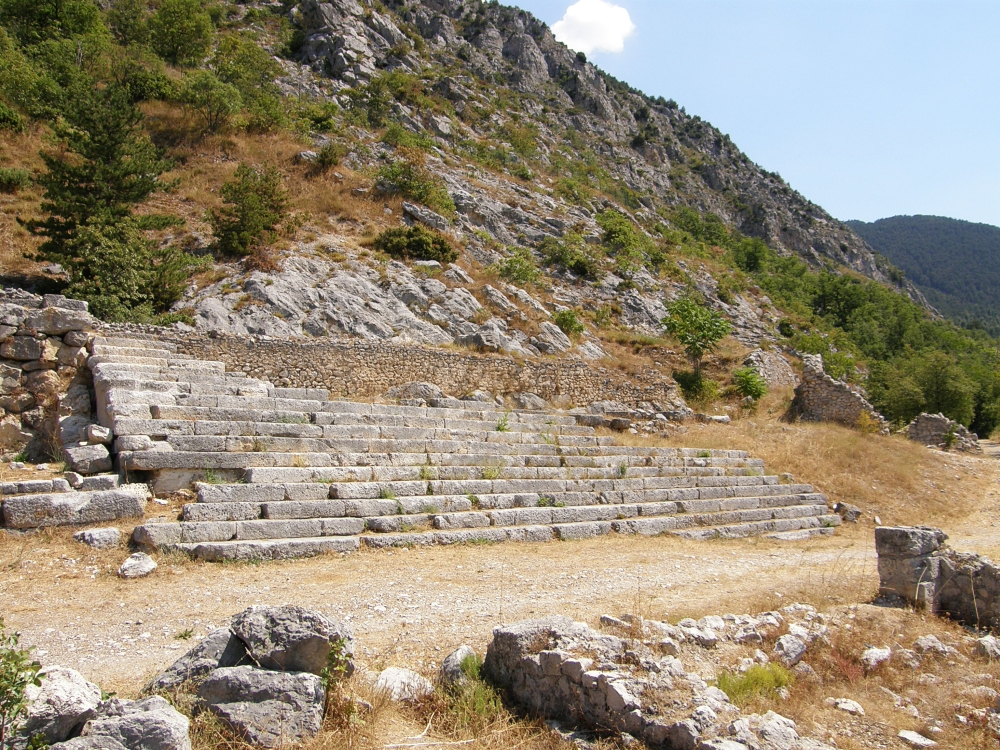
southern stairway

The large southern stairway could have been a monumental entrance, perhaps also used as a meeting place for local assemblies, under the protection of the god "Curinus".

The two terraces of the sanctuary were built in different periods: the lower one is more recent, in opus caementicium with a grandiose podium (71 m long) which houses 14 rooms covered by barrel vaults; the upper one, presillano, was closed on three sides by a colonnaded portico (some bases remain).

The altar, unusually covered with bronze plates, and the small sacellum of the divinity were located in the centre of the upper terrace.

The most important finds of the complex come from the sacellum, such as two cult statues of Hercules, one in bronze (in the Archaeological Museum of Chieti) and one in marble, as well as a small column with 12 verses in graffiti, attributed to Ovid.
