= Heraclea =

Heraclea, Heracleia, Herakleia, or Heraclia (Ancient Greek: Ἡράκλεια) may refer to:

== Places ==
- Heraclea (island), in the Aegean Sea, today called Iraklia or Irakleia

=== Ancient cities ===
==== In Asia ====
- Heraclea Cybistra, Konya Province, Turkey
  - Ereğli, Konya, the modern city
- Heraclea ad Latmum, near Lake Bafa, Turkey
- Heraclea Pontica, Zonguldak Province, Turkey
  - Karadeniz Ereğli, the modern city
- Heraclea (Aeolis), a place in Aeolis near Melampagos, Turkey
- Heraclea (Lydia), a place in Lydia near Sipylus, Turkey
- Heraclea Salbace, a place in Caria near Mount Salbacus, Turkey
- Heraclea (Media), a place in Media (modern-day Iran)

==== In Europe ====
- Heraclea (Thracian Chersonese), a town in the Thracian Chersonese, now in Turkey
- Heraclea (Lucania), a town in the Lucanian district of southern Italy
- Heraclea Lyncestis, a town founded by Philip II of Macedon near the modern town of Bitola, North Macedonia
- Heraclea Minoa, a town on the south coast of Sicily
- Heraclea Perinthus, city of ancient Thrace, now in Tekirdağ Province, Turkey
  - Marmara Ereğlisi, the modern city
- Heraclea Sintica, now in Bulgaria
- Heraclea in Trachis (also called Heraclea Trachinia), south of the river Spercheios to the west of Thermopylae
- Heraclea, ancient name of Saint-Tropez
- Herakleia (Acarnania), a city in Acarnania
- Heraclea (Athamania), a city of ancient Athamania
- Heracleia (Crete), a town of ancient Crete
- Heraclea (Elis), a city of ancient Elis
- Heraclea (Mygdonia), a town in Mygdonia
- Heraclea by Erice, a place near Erice, Sicily
- Heraclea (Illyria), a place in Illyria, possibly on Hvar island

=== Modern places ===
- Eraclea, Italy
- Ereğli (disambiguation), various places in Turkey
- Irakleia (disambiguation), various places in Greece

== Other uses ==
- Heracleia (festival), ancient festivals honoring the divine hero Heracles
- Heracleia, largely lost epic poem of Panyassis of Halicarnassus
- Heracleia, epic poem of Peisander of Rhodes recounting the Labours of Heracles
- Heraclia (moth), a genus of moths in the family Noctuidae
- Heraclia (plant), a taxonomic synonym for the genus Centaurea
- Battle of Heraclea in 280 BC between the Romans and a coalition of Greeks

== See also ==
- Diocese of Heraclea (disambiguation)
