= Heracleium (disambiguation) =

Heracleium is an ancient city of Crete.

Heracleium or Herakleion (Ancient Greek: Ἡράκλειον) may also refer to:

- Heracleium (Bithynia), ancient town of Bithynia, now in Turkey
- Heracleium (Egypt), ancient town of Egypt
- Heracleium (Ionia), ancient town of Ionia, now in Turkey
- Heracleium (Pieria), ancient town of Pieria
- Heracleium (Pontus), ancient town of Pontus, now in Turkey

== See also ==
- Heracleum (disambiguation)
