= Manganese (disambiguation) =

Manganese is a chemical element with symbol Mn and atomic number 25.

Manganese may also refer to:

- Manganese, Minnesota, a ghost town
- Manganese, West Virginia
- SS Manganese, a steamship

== See also ==
- Mn (disambiguation)
- Isotopes of manganese
