= Lygdamis =

Lygdamis may refer to:

- Tugdamme (or Lygdamis or Dygdamis), Cimmerian king, 679-640 BCE
- Lygdamis of Naxos, tyrant of Naxos Island in 545–524 BCE
- Lygdamis of Halicarnassus, satrap of Caria in the 6th century BC, father of Artemisia I of Caria
- Lygdamis II of Halicarnassus, tyrant of Halicarnassus in the 5th century BC, grandson of Artemisia I of Caria
- Lygdamis (genus), a bristleworm in family Sabellariidae
