= Theudoria =

Theudoria was an ancient town located in south-eastern Epirus. It was one of the chief towns of the Athamanians, along with Argithea, Heraclea and Tetraphylia.
