= Heraclean =

Heraclean is an adjective which may refer to:

- Heracles, the greatest of the Greek heroes
- Any of the cities named Heraclea

== See also ==
- Heraclean labours, the labours of Heracles
- Heraclean Tablets, tablets found near Heraclea Lucania
- Heraclean Way, the longest road built by the Romans in Iberia
