= Diocese of Heraclea =

Diocese of Heraclea may refer to:

- Archdiocese of Heraclea in Europe, former Orthodox and titular Catholic metropolitan see at Marmara Ereğlisi in Turkey
- Diocese of Eraclea, former and now titular Catholic see at Eraclea in Italy
- Diocese of Heraclea at Latmus, former Orthodox and titular Catholic see at Heraclea at Latmus in Turkey
- Diocese of Heraclea Lyncestis, former Orthodox and titular Catholic see at Heraclea Lyncestis in North Macedonia
- Diocese of Heraclea Pontica, former Orthodox and titular Catholic see at Heraclea Pontica in Turkey
- Diocese of Heraclea Salbace, former Orthodox and titular Catholic see at Heraclea Salbace in Turkey

== See also ==
- Heraclea (disambiguation)
