= Irakleio =

- Irakleio, Attica
- Irakleio, Thessaloniki
- A.E. Irakleio F.C
- Irakleio metro station

== See also ==
- Heraklion (disambiguation)
- Irakleia (disambiguation)
