= Melampagos =

Town of ancient Aeolis

Coordinates: 38°33′57″N 27°09′38″E

Melampagos (Ancient Greek: Μελανπάγος) was a town of ancient Aeolis. It is evidenced by epigraphic evidence dated to the 5th century BCE on decrees establishing boundaries between Melampagos and Heraclea.

Its site is located near Gökkaya, Asiatic Turkey.
