= List of Latin place names in Asia =

This list includes Asian countries and regions that were part of the Roman Empire, or that were given Latin place names in historical references.

== Background ==
Until the Modern Era, Latin was the common language for scholarship and mapmaking. During the 19th and 20th centuries, German scholars in particular made significant contributions to the study of historical place names, or Ortsnamenkunde. These studies have, in turn, contributed to the study of genealogy. For genealogists and historians of pre-Modern Europe, knowing alternate names of places is vital to extracting information from both public and private records. Even specialists in this field point out, however, that the information can be easily taken out of context, since there is a great deal of repetition of place names throughout Europe; reliance purely on apparent connections should therefore be tempered with valid historical methodology.

== Caveats and notes ==
Latin place names are not always exclusive to one place — for example, there were several Roman cities whose names began with Colonia and then a more descriptive term. During the Middle Ages, these were often shortened to just Colonia. One of these, Colonia Agrippinensis, retains the name today in the form of Cologne.

Early sources for Roman names show numerous variants and spellings of the Latin names.

The modern canonical name is listed first. Sources are listed chronologically. In general, only the earliest source is shown for each name, although many of the names are recorded in more than one of the sources. Where the source differs in spelling, or has other alternatives, these are listed following the source. As an aid to searching, variants are spelled completely, and listed in most likely chronology.

Superscripts indicate:

1. Latinized form of the Greek-derived name.
2. Latinized form of the Asian-derived name via Greek.
3. Altered Latinized form of the Greek-derived name.

== Cities and towns in Anatolia (Turkey) ==
Canonical Latin Name (source(s): variant(s))	English name (native language(s)) - older name(s), (other language(s)), location(s)
Ancyra	Ankara
Antiochia Mygdonia	Nusaybin, Mardin Province
Dorylaeum	near Eskişehir
Ephesus	Efes
Flavias, Flaviopolis	Kozan, Adana Province
Halicarnassus¹	Bodrum
Heraclea Pontica	Bender Eregli
Hierapolis	Pamukkale
Ilium	Troy
Mopsuestia (5PNH22: Mopsos)	Misis - Missis - Mamistra - Hadriana - Seleucia, Adana Province
Nicaea	Iznik
Nicomedia¹	İzmit
Ninica, Claudiopolis	Mut, Adana Province
Prusa, Brusa	Bursa
Seleucia Calycadnus, Seleucia Isauria, Seleucia Tracheotis	Silifke - Selefke, Adana Province
Trapezus	Trabzon - Trebizond
Pergamon	Bergama
Chalcedonia	Kadıköy
Iconium, Iconia	Konya
Heraklia, Eraclea	Ereğli
Assos	Asos
Smyrna	İzmir
Caesarea	Kayseri
Tarsus	Tarsus
Attaleia	Antalya
Amastris	Amasya
Alexandria Ad Issum	Iskenderun
Nicomedia	Izmit
Phoenicia¹	Fenike

== Cities and towns in Afghanistan ==
Canonical Latin Name (source(s): variant(s))	English name (native language(s)) - older name(s), (other language(s)), location(s)
Alexandria Arachosia	Kandahār
Alexandria Ariana, Alexandria in Aria, Aria	Herāt
Alexandria ad Caucasum, Alexandria Caucasiana	Bagrām / Chārikār
Alexandria Oxiana, Eucratidia¹	Ai-Khanoum (or Termez in Uzbekistan?)
Phrada², Prophthasia¹	Farāh

== Cities and towns in Cyprus ==
Canonical Latin Name (source(s): variant(s))	English name (native language(s)) - older name(s), (other language(s)), location(s)
Larnaca¹	Larnaca
Salamis¹	Salamis

== Cities and towns in Georgia ==
Canonical Latin Name (source(s): variant(s))	English name (native language(s)) - older name(s), (other language(s)), location(s)
Athōs Novum, Anacopia	New Athos
Phasis²	Poti
Triphelis	Tbilisi

== Cities and towns in Iran ==
Canonical Latin Name (source(s): variant(s))	English name (native language(s)) - older name(s), (other language(s)), location(s)
Alexandria in Carmania	Golāshkerd

== Cities and towns in Iraq ==
Canonical Latin Name (source(s): variant(s))	English name (native language(s)) - older name(s), (other language(s)), location(s)
Alexandria in Susiana	Al-Qurnah
Alexandria	Iskandariya

== Cities and towns in Israel ==
Canonical Latin Name (source(s): variant(s))	English name (native language(s)) - older name(s), (other language(s)), location(s)
Aelia Capitolina, Hierosolyma	Jerusalem - Ilea - Iliya (إلياء)
Alexandrium	Kfar Stuna
Antipatris¹	Kfar Saba - Ras-el-Ain ???
Azotus²	Ashdod (or Gaza in the Palestinian territories?)
Caesarea	Caesarea
Iopea	Jaffa (Yafo) / Tel Aviv
Flavia Neapolis¹	Nablus
Scythopolis¹	Beit She'an
Tiberias	Tveria

== Cities and towns in Lebanon ==
Canonical Latin Name (source(s): variant(s))	English name (native language(s)) - older name(s), (other language(s)), location(s)
Arca Caesarea	Arqa
Berytus²	Beirut (Bayrūt)
Methana²	Meshen
Tripolis¹	Tripoli

== Cities and towns in Pakistan ==
Canonical Latin Name (source(s): variant(s))	English name (native language(s)) - older name(s), (other language(s)), location(s)
Alexandria Indiana	Uch
Alexandria Nicaea, Nicaea, Bucephala	Jhelum
Arigaeum	Nawagai
Rhambacia	Bela

== Cities and towns in the Palestinian territories ==
Canonical Latin Name (source(s): variant(s))	English name (native language(s)) - older name(s), (other language(s)), location(s)
Gaza²	Gaza
Raphia²	Rafah

== Cities and towns in Russia ==
Canonical Latin Name (source(s): variant(s))	English name (native language(s)) - older name(s), (other language(s)), location(s)
Tobolium	Tobolsk

== Cities and towns in Syria ==
Canonical Latin Name (source(s): variant(s))	English name (native language(s)) - older name(s), (other language(s)), location(s)
Beroea	Aleppo
Damascus	Damascus (Dimashq)
Emesa	Homs
Palmyra	Palmyra (Tadmor)
Sergiopolis	Resafa

== Cities and towns in Tajikistan ==
Canonical Latin Name (source(s): variant(s))	English name (native language(s)) - older name(s), (other language(s)), location(s)
Alexandria Eschatē¹, Alexandria Ultima	Khujand

== Cities and towns in Turkmenistan ==
Canonical Latin Name (source(s): variant(s))	English name (native language(s)) - older name(s), (other language(s)), location(s)
Alexandria in Margiana, Antiochia in Margiana	Merv

== Cities and towns in Uzbekistan ==
Canonical Latin Name (source(s): variant(s))	English name (native language(s)) - older name(s), (other language(s)), location(s)
Alexandria	Iskandar
Maracanda	Samarkand

== See also ==
- Chemical elements named after places (several element names employ Latin place names)
- List of Latin place names used as specific names
