= Lygdamid dynasty =

Dynasty of tyrants in the region of Caria

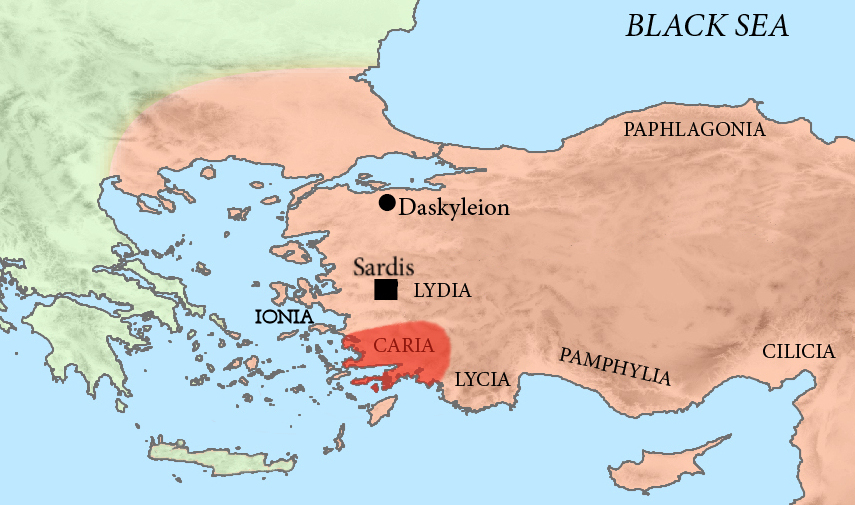
Lygdamis II was tyrant of Caria, under the rule of the Achaemenid Empire.

The Lygdamid dynasty (c. 520–450 BCE) was a dynasty of tyrants in the region of Caria, who were subordinate to the Achaemenid Empire following the conquests of Cyrus the Great through his general Harpagus. The dynasty was founded by Lygdamis, of Carian-Greek ethnicity.

The dynasty issued several tyrants, until the last one, Lygdamis II, died c. 454 BCE, after which Halicarnassus joined the Athenian alliance, known as the Delian League. At that time, Halicarnassus started to appear on the Athenian tribute quota lists.

From 395 BCE, Caria would again fall under the control of the Achaemenid Empire and be ruled by a new dynasty of local tyrants, the Hecatomnids.

== Rulers ==
- Lygdamis I (c. 520–484 BCE)
- Artemisia (c. 484–460 BCE)
- Pisindelis (c. 460–454 BCE)
- Lygdamis II (c. 454–450 BCE)
