= Irakleia =

Irakleia (Ηράκλεια) may refer to several places in Greece:

- Irakleia, Arta, a municipal unit in Arta regional unit
- Irakleia, Elis, a village in Elis
- Irakleia, Cyclades, an island in the Cyclades
- Irakleia, Serres, a municipality in Serres regional unit
- Irakleia, Phthiotis, a village in Phthiotis regional unit

== See also ==
- Heraklion (disambiguation)
- Heraclea (disambiguation)
- Irakleio (disambiguation)
