= Pisindelis =

5th century BCE tyrant of Achaemenid Caria

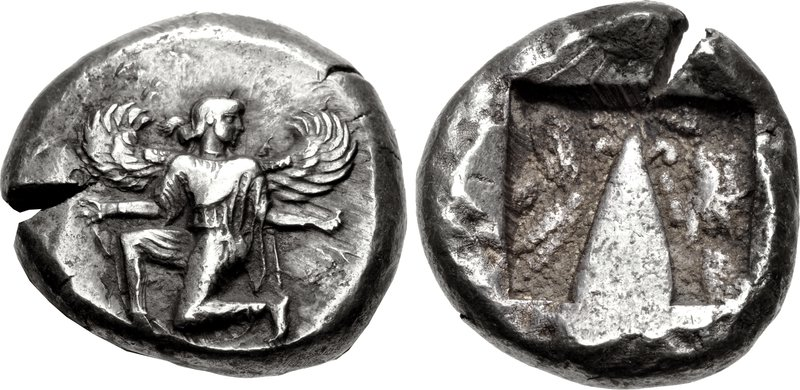
Coinage of Kaunos, Caria at the time of Pisindelis. Circa 470-450 BC.

Pisindelis (Ancient Greek: Πισίνδηλις), ruled c.460–450 BCE, was a tyrant of Caria, from its capital Halicarnassus, under the Achaemenid Empire. He was the son of Artemisia I of Caria, and part of the Lygdamid dynasty.

He was said to be a young man already at the time his mother Artemisia fought at the head of the Carian fleet at the Battle of Salamis (479 BCE) under King Xerxes I. He is mentioned by Herodotus as he described the involvement of his mother at Salamis:

Artemisia, who moves me to marvel greatly that a woman should have gone with the armament against Hellas; for her husband being dead, she herself had his sovereignty and a young son withal, and followed the host under no stress of necessity, but of mere high-hearted valour. Artemisia was her name; she was daughter to Lygdamis, on her father's side of Halicarnassian lineage, and a Cretan on her mother's. She was the leader of the men of Halicarnassus and Cos and Nisyrus and Calydnos, furnishing five ships. Her ships were reputed the best in the whole fleet after the ships of Sidon; and of all his allies she p403 gave the king the best counsels. The cities, whereof I said she was the leader, are all of Dorian stock, as I can show, the Halicarnassians being of Troezen, and the rest of Epidaurus.

— Herodotus VII.99.

He probably had to abandon his throne around 452-449 BCE. His son was Lygdamis II, last tyrant of the Lygdamid dynasty, before Caria joined the Athenian alliance of the Delian League for about 50 years.
