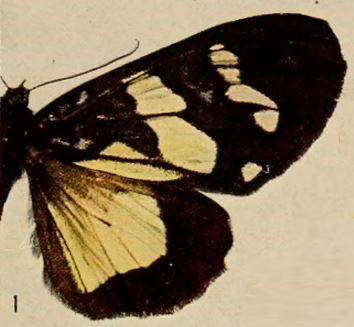

Scientific classification
- Domain: Eukaryota
- Kingdom: Animalia
- Phylum: Arthropoda
- Class: Insecta
- Order: Lepidoptera
- Superfamily: Noctuoidea
- Family: Noctuidae
- Genus: Heraclia
- Species: H. gruenbergi

Binomial name
- Heraclia gruenbergi (Wichgraf, 1911)

Synonyms
- Xanthospilapteryx grünbergi Wichgraf, 1911; Xanthospilopteryx atribasalis Hampson, 1912; Xanthospilopteryx medjensis Holland, 1897

= Heraclia gruenbergi =

Species of moth

Heraclia gruenbergi is a species of moth of the family Noctuidae. It is found in Kenya, Uganda, and the Democratic Republic of Congo.
