= Heraclea Sintica =

Ancient Greek city in Blagoevgrad Province, Bulgaria

- Ἡράκλεια Σιντική (Ancient Greek)
- Heraclea Strymonike
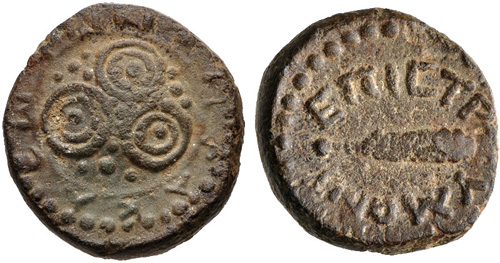
- Coin struck in Heraclea Sintica c. 101–138 AD during reign of Trajan or Hadrian. Obv.: ornamented Macedonian shield; rev.: club of Heracles lying upright.

- Location within Bulgaria Location within Balkans
- 41°27′01″N 23°15′52″E
- Type: Settlement
- Cultures: Macedonian, Greco-Roman
- Location: Blagoevgrad Province, Bulgaria
- Part of: Macedonia, Ancient Rome

History
- Built: 356–339 BC
- Abandoned: c. 500 AD

Site notes
- Condition: Ruined
- Public access: Yes
- Website: https://petrichhistorymuseum.bg/ (in Bulgarian)

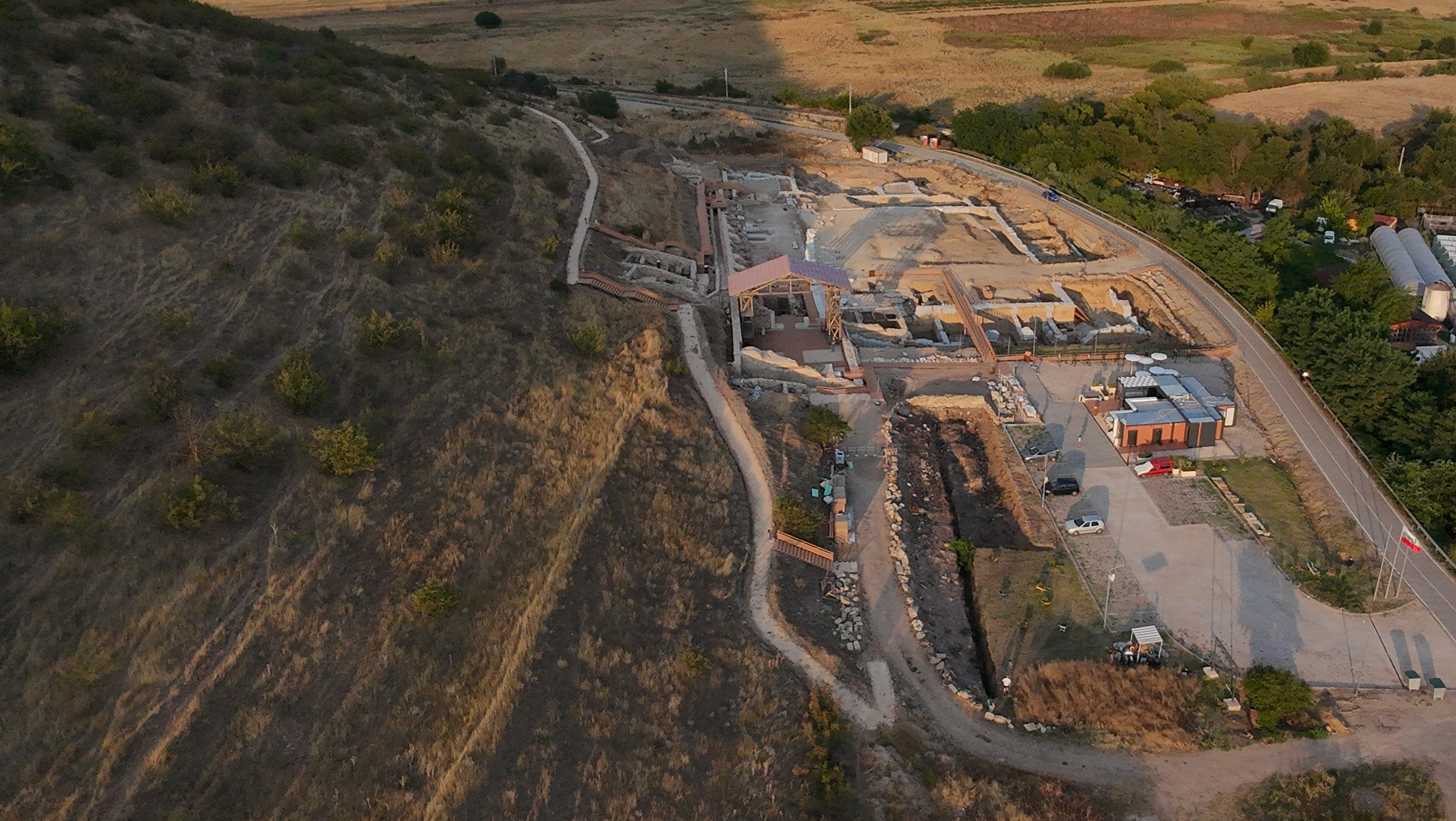
Excavation site in Heraclea Sintica - general view

Heraclea Sintica (Ancient Greek: Ἡράκλεια Σιντική, romanized: Hērákleia Sintikḗ; Bulgarian: Хераклея Синтика), also known as Heraclea Strymonike, was an ancient Greek city located near what is now the village of Rupite in south-western Bulgaria.

== History ==
Heraclea Sintica was founded sometime between 356 and 339 BC by Philip II of Macedon with Macedonian settlers from Heraclea in Mygdonia. This settlement may have replaced a previous Thracian tribal center called Sintia as the Roman historian Livy emphasized that Heraclea lay within the territories of the Sintoi. These people were evidently chased away at the city's foundation, however, as Appian included the Sintoi with the Dardanians and Enetoi as tribes outside the province of Macedonia. Moreover, there is a conspicuous absence of Thracian names among inscriptions from Heraclea which also suggests that the Sintoi had been driven out of the Strymon Valley and that they did not intermix with the colonizers.

The general Asclepiodotus of Heraclea was a native. Demetrius, son of Philip V of Macedon, was slain at Heraclea Sintica. Coins minted here in antiquity have survived.

A major earthquake around 425 AD destroyed much of the city's infrastructure, including the civic basilica, and caused the nearby Strumeshnitsa River to flood the forum. After 457 AD, small groups resettled amid the ruins, but by around 500 AD there were no signs of permanent habitation and the city was effectively abandoned.

The polis was identified by Assoc. Prof. Georgi Mitrev (University of Plovdiv) after the accidental discovery of a large Latin inscription in 2002. In essence, this is letter of Emperor Galerius and Caesar Maximinus II from 308 AD in which the rulers are turning to Herakleians in response to their request to reclaim the lost city rights. Before 2005, Mitrev published another inscription, which mentions Guy Lucius Skotussaios and Harakleios. It proves conclusively that this is precisely Heraclea Sintica, not another Herculaneum or Heraclea, as this name is very popular in the ancient world.

Since 2007 archaeological excavations have been taking place at Heraclea Sintica, led by Assoc. Prof. Lyudmil Vagalinski, of the National Institute with Museum of Archaeology in Sofia. They noticed strange structures above it: tunnels and an arch. Later on, after geosonar examination by Russian specialists, a large studio for producing ceramic masks for an unknown and as yet unrevealed ancient theatre was discovered.

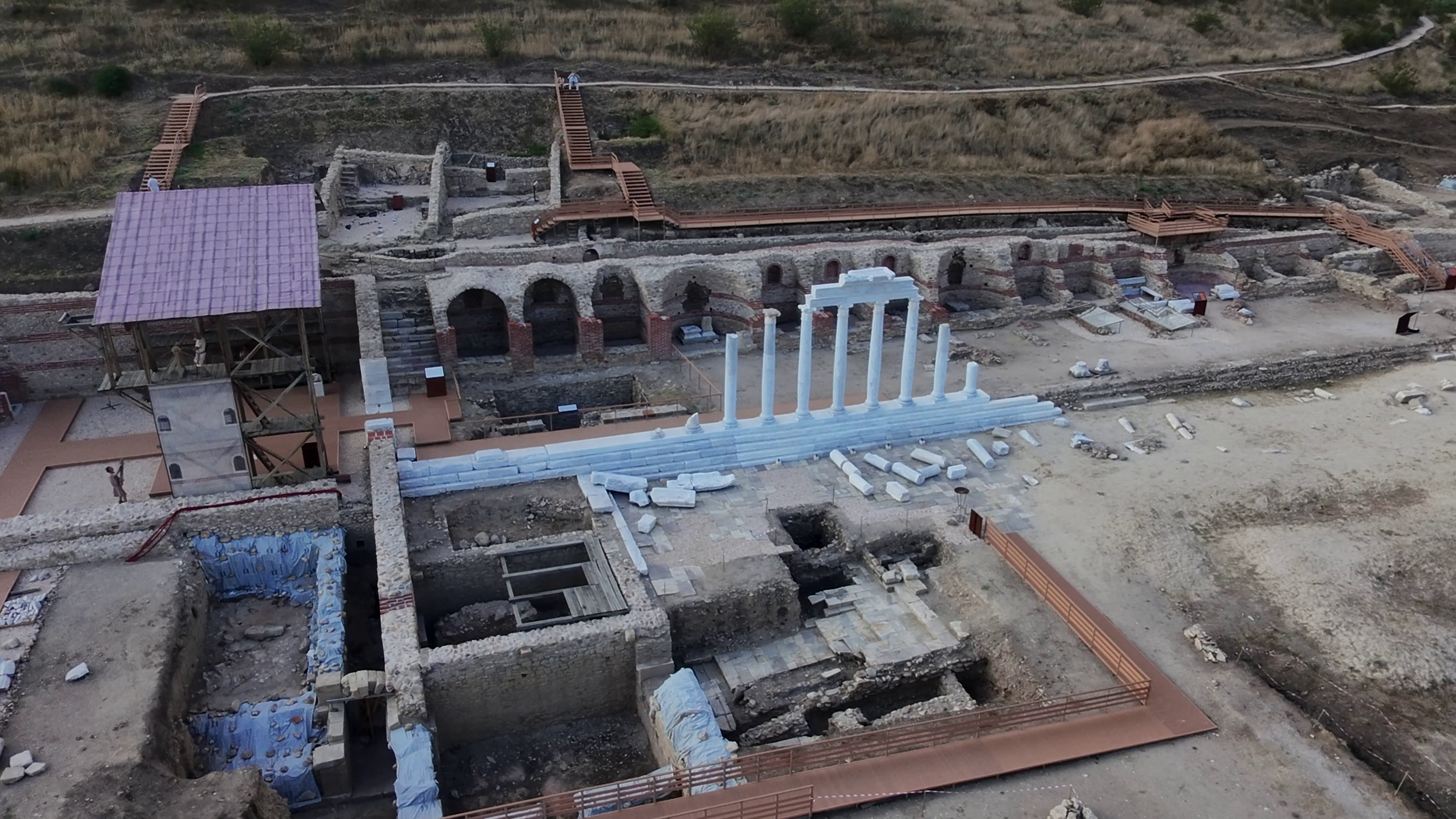
Excavation site in Heraclea Sintica

In 2024, excavations in an ancient sewer revealed most of a marble statue of Hermes that had been placed carefully in the sewer and then covered with soil. Initial archaeological investigations suggest that citizens buried the statue intentionally. Further excavations are planned to reveal the complete statue, to make it available for further research, and to remove it for placement in a museum.

In February 2026, archaeologists at the Western Necropolis announced the discovery of a 4th-century AD Roman grave containing a woman of mixed European and African ancestry. Anthropological analysis by Dr. Victoria Ruseva indicates the woman was between 35 and 40 years old at the time of her death and suffered from scoliosis and degenerative spinal illness. Her high social status is suggested by the grave construction, which used precisely shaped stone blocks and heavy slabs. Inside, researchers found a glass goblet and a lamp depicting the Greek god Eros.

== See also ==
- Heraclea Lyncestis
