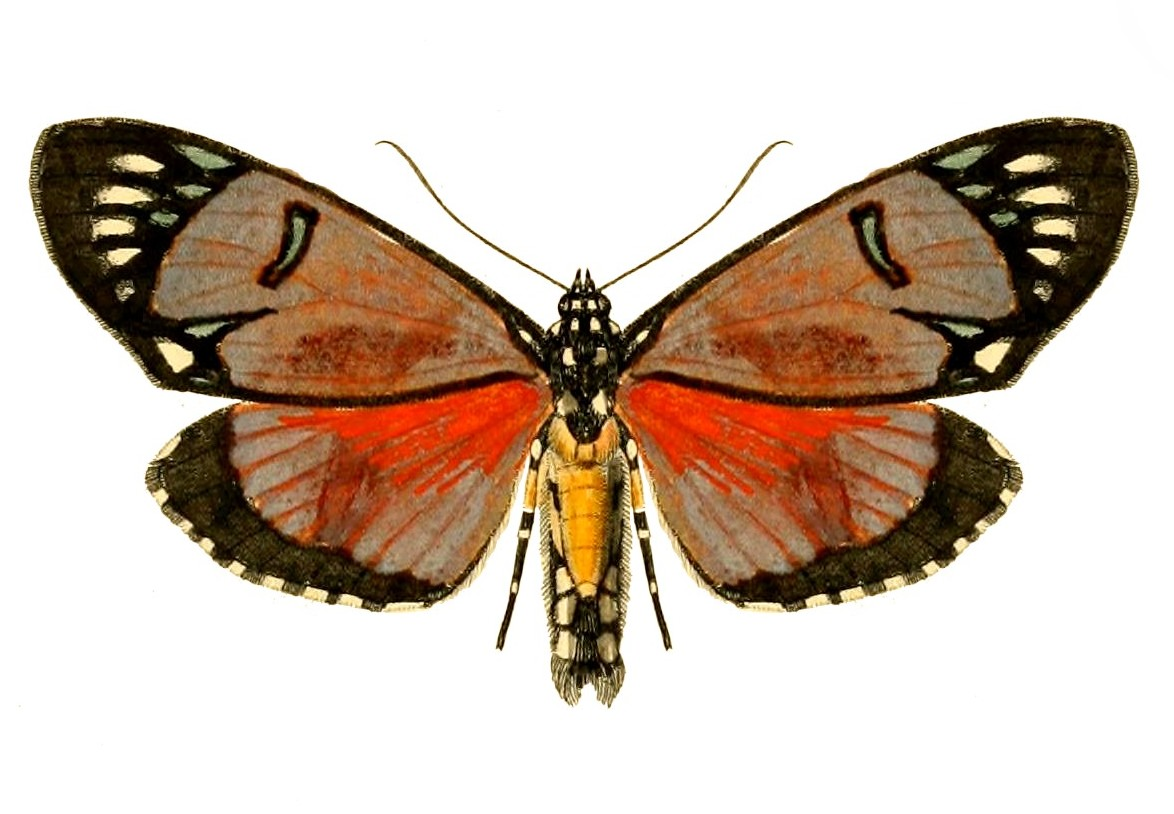

Scientific classification
- Domain: Eukaryota
- Kingdom: Animalia
- Phylum: Arthropoda
- Class: Insecta
- Order: Lepidoptera
- Superfamily: Noctuoidea
- Family: Noctuidae
- Genus: Heraclia
- Species: H. poggei

Binomial name
- Heraclia poggei (Dewitz, 1879)

Synonyms
- Eusemia poggei Dewitz, 1879; Eusemia falkensteinii Dewitz, 1881; Xanthospilopteryx poggei

= Heraclia poggei =

Species of moth

Heraclia poggei is a species of moth of the family Noctuidae. It is found in Sub-Saharan Africa from Guinea east to Chad and Kenya and south to Angola.
