= Artemisia I of Caria =

Ancient Greek queen of the 5th century BC

Artemisia I of Caria Ἀρτεμισία (Greek)
- Queen of Halicarnassus, Kos, Nisyros, and Kalymnos
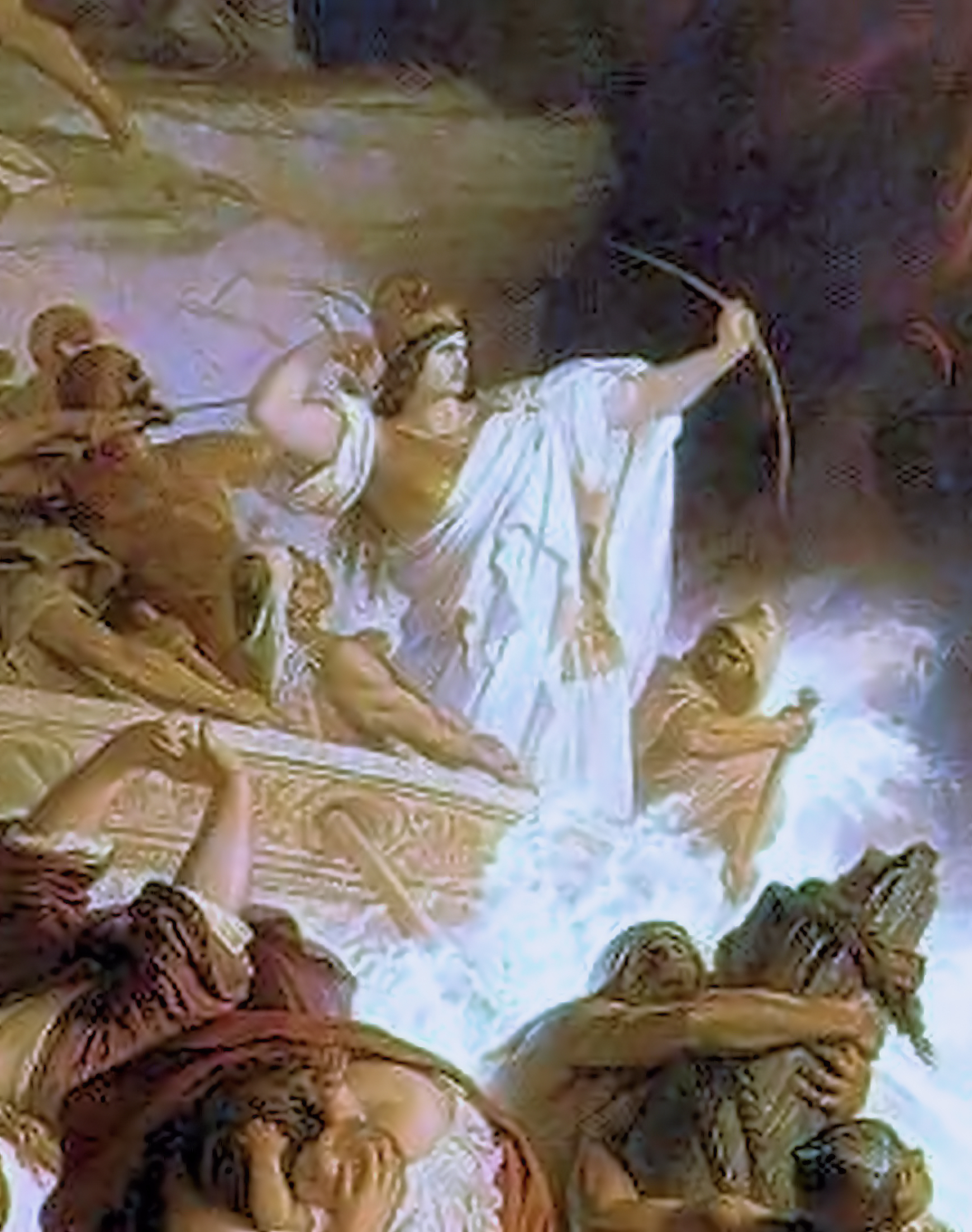
- Painting by German artist Wilhelm von Kaulbach depicting Artemisia shooting arrows at the Greek fleet during the Battle of Salamis, 1868
- Reign: fl. 480 BC
- Predecessor: Unknown (her husband)
- Successor: Pisindelis
- Born: Halicarnassus (modern-day Bodrum, Turkey)
- Issue: Pisindelis
- Dynasty: Lygdamid
- Father: Lygdamis I
- Religion: Greek polytheism

Artemisia I of Caria (Ancient Greek: Ἀρτεμισία, transl. Ártemisía; fl. 480 BC) was a queen of the ancient Greek city-state of Halicarnassus, which is now in Bodrum, Turkey. She was also queen of the nearby islands of Kos, Nisyros and Kalymnos, within the Achaemenid satrapy of Caria, in about 480 BC. She was of Carian-Greek ethnicity by her father Lygdamis I, and Greek Cretan by her mother. She fought as an ally of Xerxes I, King of Persia against the independent Greek city states during the second Persian invasion of Greece. She personally commanded ships at the naval battle of Artemisium and at the naval Battle of Salamis in 480 BC. She is mostly known through the writings of Herodotus, himself a native of Halicarnassus, who praises her courage and relates the respect in which she was held by Xerxes.

== Family ==
Artemisia's father was the satrap of Halicarnassus, Lygdamis I (Λύγδαμις Α') and her mother was from the island of Crete. She took the throne after the death of her husband, as she had a son, named Pisindelis (Πισίνδηλις), who was still a youth. Artemisia's grandson, Lygdamis II (Λύγδαμις Β'), was the satrap of Halicarnassus when Herodotus was exiled from there and the poet Panyasis (Πανύασις) was sentenced to death, after the unsuccessful uprising against him.

== Second Persian invasion of Greece ==
According to Thessalus, the King of Persia demanded earth and water from the Coans in 493 BC but they refused, and so he gave the island to Artemisia to be wasted. Artemisia led a fleet of ships to Cos to slaughter the Coans, but Thessalus claimed that Zeus intervened and Artemisia's ships were destroyed by lightning, and she was forced to retreat. However, she later returned and conquered them.

=== Battle of Salamis ===
Xerxes was induced by the message of Themistocles to attack the Greek fleet under unfavourable conditions, rather than sending a part of his ships to the Peloponnese and awaiting the dissolution of the Greek armies. Artemisia was the only one of Xerxes' naval commanders to advise against the action, then went on to earn her king's praise for her leadership in action during his fleet's defeat by the Greeks at the Battle of Salamis (September, 480 BC).

==== Preparations ====
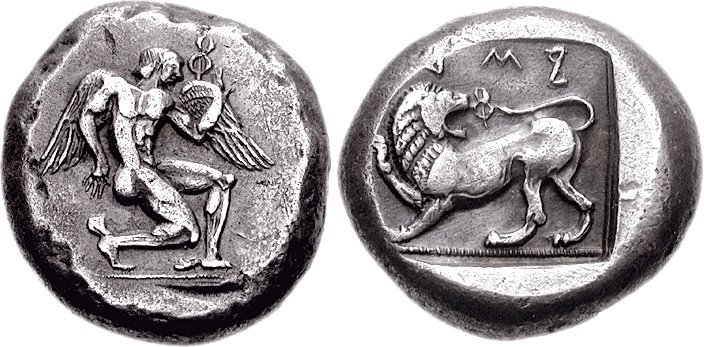
Coinage of Caria at the time of Artemisia (c. 480–460 BC).

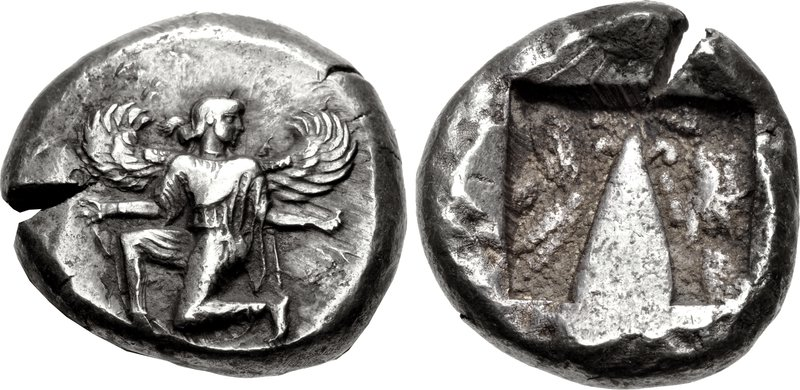
Coinage of Kaunos, Caria at the end of Artemisia's rule, and beginning of the rule of her son Pisindelis. Obv: Winged female figure running right, head left, holding kerykeion in her right hand, and a victory wreath in left. Rev: Baetyl in incuse square. Circa 470–450 BC.

Before the battle of Salamis, Xerxes gathered all his naval commanders and sent Mardonios to ask whether or not he should fight a naval battle. All the commanders advised him to fight a naval battle except Artemisia.

As Herodotus tells it, she told Mardonios:

Tell the King to spare his ships and not do a naval battle because our enemies are much stronger than us in the sea, as men are to women. And why does he need to risk a naval battle? Athens for which he did undertake this expedition is his and the rest of Greece too. No man can stand against him and they who once resisted, were destroyed.

If Xerxes chose not to rush into a naval encounter, but instead kept his ships close to the shore and either stayed there or moved them towards the Peloponnese, victory would be his. The Greeks can't hold out against him for very long. They will leave for their cities, because they don't have food in store on this island, as I have learned, and when our army will march against the Peloponnese they who have come from there will become worried and they will not stay here to fight to defend Athens.

But if he hurries to engage I am afraid that the navy will be defeated and the land-forces will be weakened as well. In addition, he should also consider that he has certain untrustworthy allies, like the Egyptians, the Cyprians, the Kilikians and the Pamphylians, who are completely useless.

Xerxes was pleased with her advice and while he already held her in great esteem he now praised her further. Despite this, he gave orders to follow the advice of the rest of his commanders. Xerxes thought that at the naval battle of Artemisium his men acted like cowards because he was not there to watch them. But this time he would watch the battle himself to ensure they would act bravely.

Plutarch, in On the Malice of Herodotus, believe that Herodotus wrote that because he just wanted verses in order to make Artemisia look like a Sibyl, who was prophesying of things to come.

==== Engagement ====
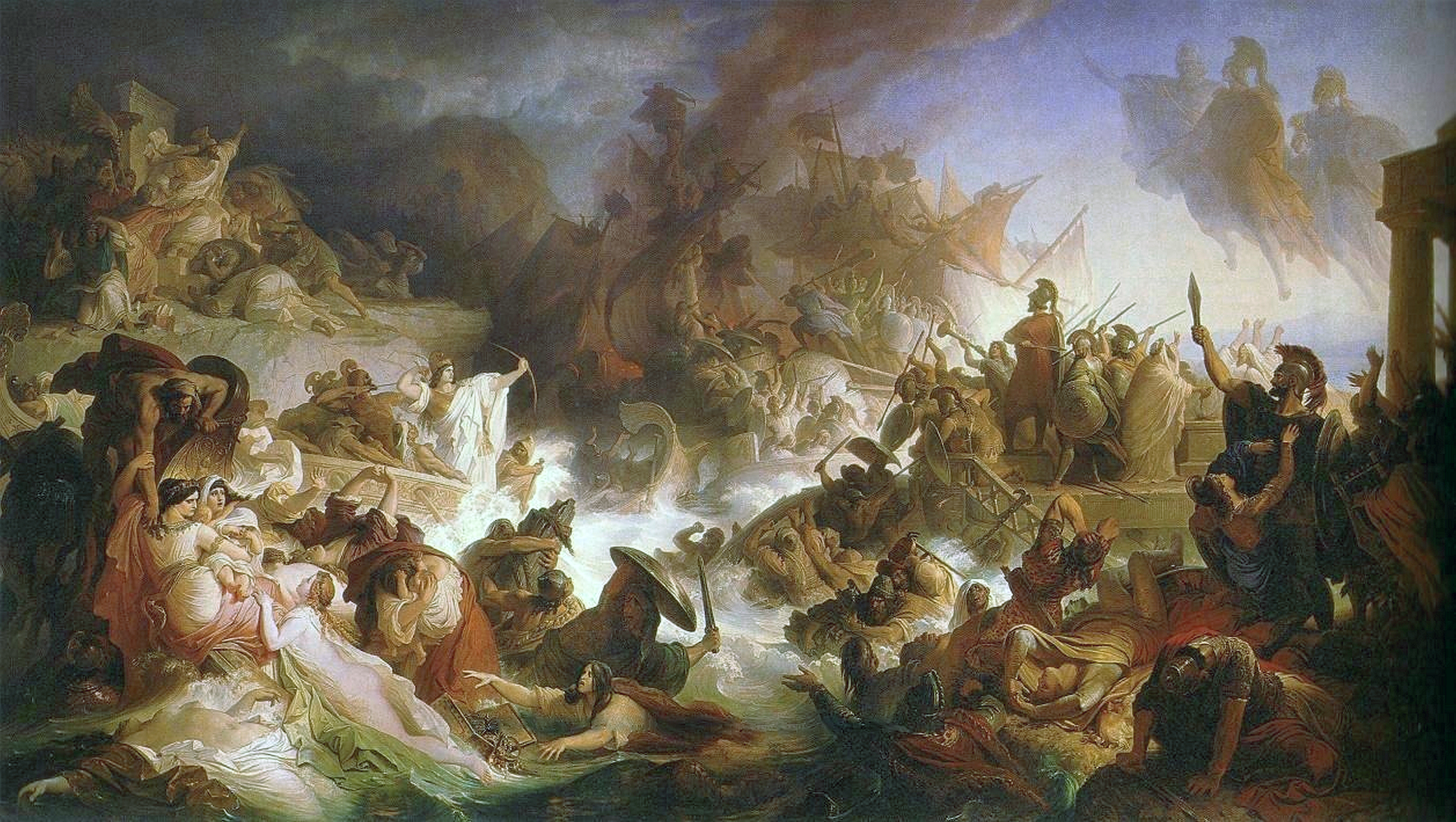
Battle of Salamis (Die Seeschlacht bei Salamis). Artemisia appears highlighted center-left of the painting, above the victorious Greek fleet, below the throne of Xerxes, and shooting arrows at the Greeks. Wilhelm von Kaulbach.

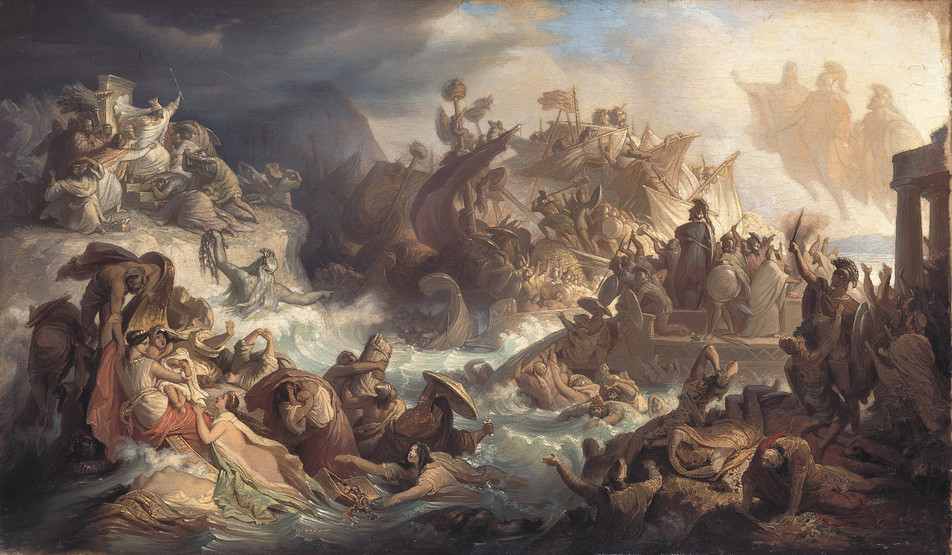
Another version of the painting also exists without Artemisia.

Artemisia participated in the Battle of Salamis in September, 480 BC as a Persian ally. She led the forces of Halicarnassos, Cos, Nisyros and Calyndos (Κάλυνδος) (Calyndos was on the southwest coast of Asia Minor across from Rhodes), and supplied five ships. The ships she brought had the second best reputation in the whole fleet, next to the ones from Sidon.

Her involvement in the campaign was described by Herodotus:

Artemisia, who moves me to marvel greatly that a woman should have gone with the armament against Hellas; for her husband being dead, she herself had his sovereignty and a young son withal, and followed the host under no stress of necessity, but of mere high-hearted valour. Artemisia was her name; she was daughter to Lygdamis, on her father's side of Halicarnassian lineage, and a Cretan on her mother's. She was the leader of the men of Halicarnassus and Cos and Nisyrus and Calydnos, furnishing five ships. Her ships were reputed the best in the whole fleet after the ships of Sidon; and of all his allies she gave the king the best counsels. The cities, whereof I said she was the leader, are all of Dorian stock, as I can show, the Halicarnassians being of Troezen, and the rest of Epidaurus.

— Herodotus VII.99.

According to Herodotus, during the battle, and while the Persian fleet was facing defeat, an Athenian ship pursued Artemisia's ship and she was not able to escape, because in front of her were friendly ships. She decided to charge against a friendly ship manned by people of Calyndos and on which the king of the Calyndians Damasithymos (Δαμασίθυμος) was located. The Calyndian ship sank. Herodotus is uncertain but offers the possibility that Artemisia had previously had a disagreement with Damasithymos at the Hellespont.

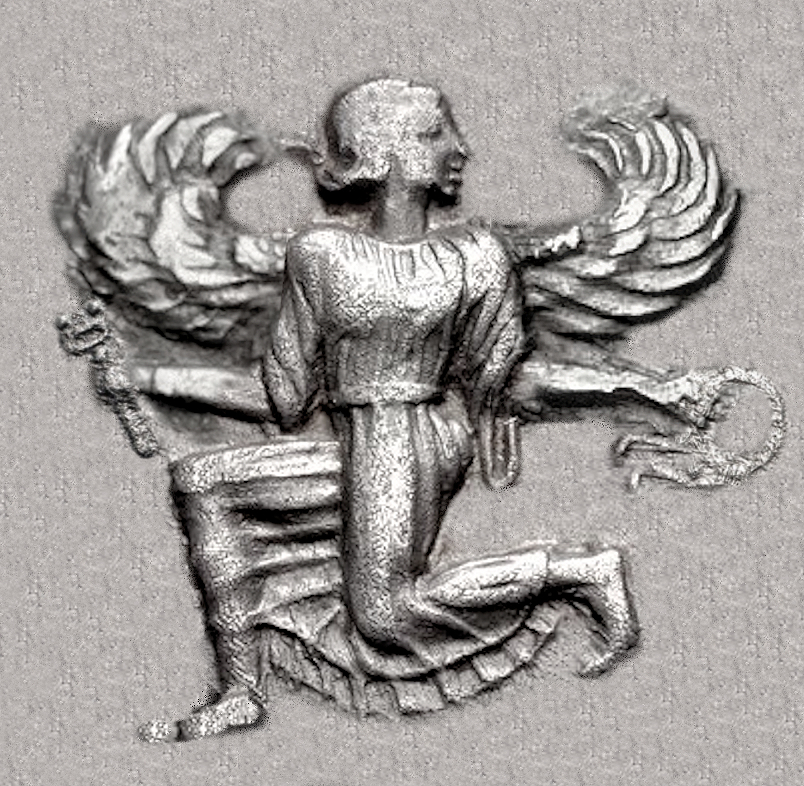
Winged female figure in kneeling-running stance, holding kerykeion and victory wreath, on the coinage of Caria around the time of Artemisia.

According to Polyaenus, when Artemisia saw that she was near to falling into the hands of the Greeks, she ordered the Persian colours to be taken down, and the master of the ship to bear down upon and attack a Persian vessel of the Calyndian allies, which was commanded by Damasithymus, that was passing by her.

When the captain of the Athenian ship, Ameinias, saw her charge against a Persian ship, he turned his ship away and went after others, supposing that the ship of Artemisia was either a Greek ship or was deserting from the Persians and fighting for the Greeks.

Herodotus believed that Ameinias did not know that Artemisia was on the ship, because otherwise he would not have ceased his pursuit until either he had captured her or had been captured himself, because "orders had been given to the Athenian captains, and moreover a prize was offered of ten thousand drachmas for the man who should take her alive; since they thought it intolerable that a woman should make an expedition against Athens."

Polyaenus in his work Stratagems (Greek: Στρατηγήματα) reports that Artemisia had in her ship two different standards. When she chased a Greek ship, she hoisted the Persian colours. But when she was chased by a Greek ship, she hoisted the Greek colours, so that the enemy might mistake her for a Greek and give up the pursuit.

While Xerxes was overseeing the battle from his throne, which was at the foot of Mount Aigaleo, he observed the incident and he and the others who were present thought that Artemisia had attacked and sunk a Greek ship. One of the men who was next to Xerxes said to him: "Master, see Artemisia, how well she is fighting, and how she sank even now a ship of the enemy" and Xerxes then responded: "My men have become women; and my women, men." None of the crew of the Calyndian ship survived to be able to accuse her otherwise. According to Polyaenus, when Xerxes saw her sink the ship, he said: "O Zeus, surely you have formed women out of man's materials, and men out of woman's."

Photius writes that a man called Draco (Greek: ∆ράκων), who was the son of Eupompus (Greek: Εύπομπος) of Samos, was in the service of Xerxes for a thousand talents. He had very good eyesight and could easily see at twenty stades. He described to Xerxes what he saw from the battle and Artemisia's bravery.

=== Aftermath ===
Plutarch, in his work Parallel Lives (Greek: Βίοι Παράλληλοι) at the part which mentions Themistocles, says that it was Artemisia who recognised the body of Ariamenes (Ἀριαμένης) (Herodotus says that his name was Ariabignes), brother of Xerxes and admiral of the Persian navy, floating amongst the shipwrecks, and brought the body back to Xerxes.

Jar of Xerxes I
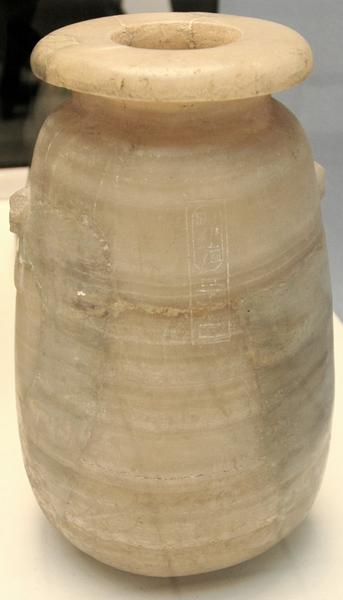
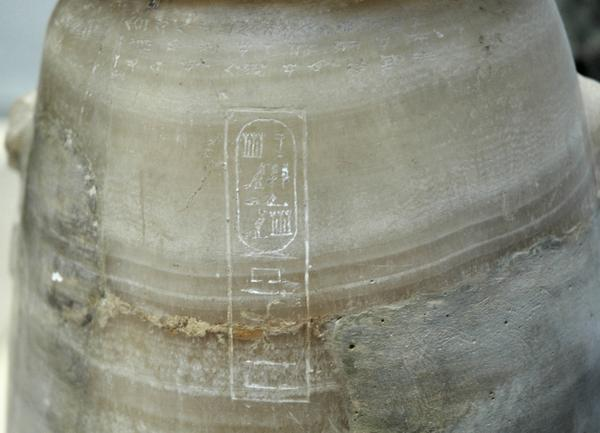
The precious Jar of Xerxes I, found in the ruins of the Mausoleum at Halicarnassus, may have been offered by Xerxes to Artemisia I, who had acted with merit as his only female Admiral during the Second Persian invasion of Greece, and particularly at the Battle of Salamis.

After the battle, according to Polyaenus, Xerxes acknowledged her to have excelled above all the officers in the fleet and sent her a complete suit of Greek armour; he also presented the captain of her ship with a distaff and spindle.

According to Herodotus, after the defeat, Xerxes presented Artemisia with two possible courses of action and asked her which she recommended. Either he would lead troops to the Peloponnese himself, or he would withdraw from Greece and leave his general Mardonius in charge. Artemisia suggested to him that he should retreat back to Asia Minor and she advocated the plan suggested by Mardonius, who requested 300,000 Persian soldiers with which he would defeat the Greeks in Xerxes' absence.

According to Herodotus she replied:

I think that you should retire and leave Mardonius behind with those whom he desires to have. If he succeeds, the honour will be yours because your slaves performed it. If on the other hand, he fails, it would be no great matter as you would be safe and no danger threatens anything that concerns your house. And while you will be safe the Greeks will have to pass through many difficulties for their own existence. In addition, if Mardonius were to suffer a disaster who would care? He is just your slave and the Greeks will have but a poor triumph. As for yourself, you will be going home with the object for your campaign accomplished, for you have burnt Athens.

Xerxes followed her advice, leaving Mardonius to conduct the war in Greece. He sent her to Ephesus to take care of his illegitimate sons. On the other hand, Plutarch mocks Herodotus' writing, since he thinks that Xerxes would have brought women with him from Susa, in case his son needed female attendants.

== Death ==
A legend, quoted by Photius, some 13 centuries later, claims that Artemisia fell in love with a man from Abydos (Ancient Greek: Ἄβῡδος), named Dardanus (Greek: Δάρδανος), and when he ignored her, she blinded him while he was sleeping, but her love for him increased. An oracle told her to jump from the top of the rock of Leucas, as those who leapt from this rock were said to be cured from the passion of love. However, she was killed after she jumped from the rock and buried near the spot. According to a legend, Sappho killed herself jumping from these cliffs too, because she was in love with Phaon.

Artemisia was succeeded by her son Pisindelis, who became the new tyrant of Caria. He would himself later be succeeded by his son Lygdamis.

== Reception in the Greco-Roman world ==
Herodotus admired Artemisia, despite her support of Persia. He praised her decisiveness and intelligence, and emphasised her strategies under Xerxes' as his Grand Admiral.

Polyaenus says that Xerxes spoke highly of her gallantry. In the eighth book of his work Stratagems, he also mentions that when Artemisia (he may have referred to Artemisia I, but most probably he referred to Artemisia II) wanted to conquer Latmus, she placed soldiers in ambush near the city and she, with women, eunuchs and musicians, celebrated a sacrifice at the grove of the Mother of the Gods, which was about seven stades distant from the city. When the inhabitants of Latmus came out to see the magnificent procession, the soldiers entered the city and took possession of it.

In his History of the World, Justin writes that she "was fighting with the greatest gallantry among the foremost leaders; so that you might have seen womanish fear in a man, and manly boldness in a woman."

On the other hand, Thessalus, a son of Hippocrates, described her in a speech as a cowardly pirate.

Aristophanes mentioned Artemisia in his works Lysistrata and Thesmophoriazusae.

Pausanias, in the third book of his work Description of Greece (Greek: Ἑλλάδος Περιήγησις), entitled Laconia (Greek: Λακωνικά), mentioned that in the marketplace of Sparta the most striking monument was the portico which they called Persian (Greek: στοὰ Περσικὴν), because it was made from spoils taken in the Persian wars. Over time, the Spartans altered it until it became very large and splendid. On the pillars were white-marble figures of Persians, including Mardonius. There was also a figure of Artemisia.

Also, the encyclopedia called the Suda mentioned Artemisia.

== In popular culture ==
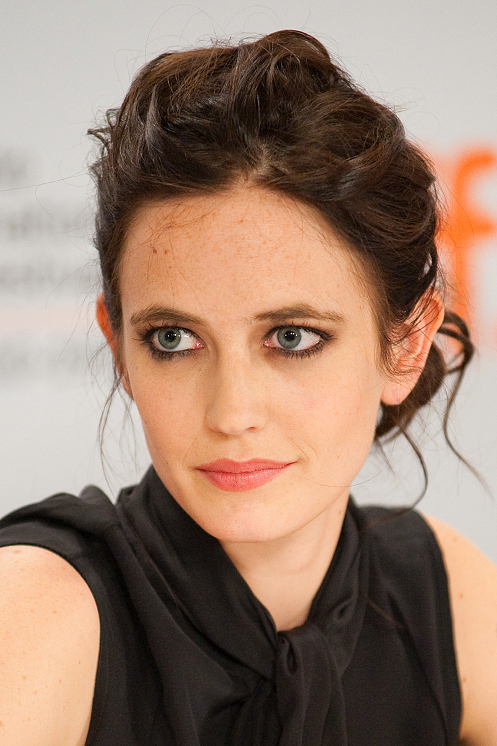
French actress Eva Green portrayed Artemisia in the 2014 film 300: Rise of an Empire.

Several modern ships were named after Artemisia. An Iranian destroyer (Persian: ناوشکن) purchased during the Pahlavi dynasty was named Artemis in her honour. This destroyer was the largest ship in the Iranian Navy. The previous name of the Greek ferryboat, Panagia Skiadeni, was Artemisia (ex-Star A, Orient Star and Ferry Tachibana).

The Artemisia Cultural Association of the municipality of Nea Alikarnassos in Crete, founded in 1979, is named after Queen Artemisia.

In the 1962 film The 300 Spartans Artemisia is portrayed by Anne Wakefield.

Artemisia appears in Gore Vidal's 1981 (and 2002 release) historical novel Creation. In Vidal's depiction, she had a long relationship with the Persian general Mardonius, who at some periods lived in Halicarnassus and acted unofficially as her consort – but that she refused to marry him, determined to preserve her independence.

In the 2014 film 300: Rise of an Empire Artemisia is featured as commander of the invading navy that the Greeks must fight, and serves as the main antagonist. She is portrayed by Eva Green.

Novelist and political scientist Dr. Roy Casagranda wrote a historical fiction novel about Artemisia entitled The Blood Throne of Caria.

In Sid Meier's Civilization VI, players can recruit her as a Great Admiral.

== See also ==
- Battle of Artemisium
- Battle of Salamis
- Themistocles
- Ameinias of Athens

== Sources ==
=== Primary sources ===
- Herodotus, The Histories, trans. Aubrey de Sélincourt, Penguin Books, 1954.
- Vitruvius, De architectura ii,8.10–11, 14–15
- Pliny the Elder, Naturalis historia xxxvi.4.30–31
- Orosius, Historiae adversus paganos ii.10.1–3
- Valerius Maximus, Factorum et dictorum memorabilium iv.6, ext. I
- Justinus, Epitome Historiarum philippicarum Pompei Trogi ii.12.23–24
- Πoλύαινoς (Polyaenus) (1809). Στρατηγήματα, Βιβλίον 8 [Stratagems, Book 8] (in Greek). pp. 290–291.

=== Modern sources ===
- Nancy Demand, A History of Ancient Greece. Boston: McGraw-Hill, 1996. ISBN 0-07-016207-7
- Salisbury, Joyce (2001). Encyclopedia of Women in the Ancient World. ABC-CLIO. pp. 20–21. ISBN 978-1576070925.
- Αρχαία Αλικαρνασσός Νέα Αλικαρνασσός Ταξίδι στο χρόνο και στην ιστορία... [Ancient Halicarnassus New Halicarnassus Journey through time and history...] (PDF) (in Greek). Prefecture of Heraklion Municipality of New Halicarnassus. 2006. pp. 24–25. ISBN 960-88514-3-2.
