= Heracleum =

Heracleum may mean

- The plant genus Heracleum (plant)
- An alternative spelling of Herakleion, the capital of Crete in Greece
- An alternative spelling of Heraklion, various places with that name
- An alternative spelling of Heracleium, various places with that name

== See also ==
- Heracleium (disambiguation)
- Heraklion (disambiguation)
- Heracles
