= Asclepiodotus of Heraclea =

Asclepiodotus of Heraclea (Ancient Greek: Ἀσκληπιόδοτος) was a commander in the army of Perseus of Macedon during the Third Macedonian War, which took place from 171 BC to 168 BC. He was a native of Heraclea in Sintice. He led a contingent of 2000 Gauls in the early stages of the war. Later, he led 10,000 light infantry in the Battle of Pydna.
