= Heraklion (disambiguation) =

Heraklion (Greek: Ἡράκλειον; alternative spellings: Iraklio, Iraklion, Irakleio, Herakleion) is a Greek city name referring to Herakles and most notably used for Heraklion, the administrative capital and largest city of Crete and the fifth largest in Greece.

Heraklion may also refer to:

== Ancient ==
- Herakleion (Pieria), in ancient Macedon, Greece
- Heracleion, an ancient city near Alexandria, Egypt
- Herculanum

== Modern ==
- Irakleio, Attica, a suburban city in the Athens urban area
- Irakleio, Corinthia, a village in Corinthia
- Irakleio, Thessaloniki, a village in Thessaloniki Prefecture
- Heraklion, Crete, a city in Heraklion Prefecture, in Crete
- Heraklion (constituency), electoral district

== Ships ==
- SS Herakleion 1925-1993, a coaster, originally SS Manganese
- SS Heraklion 1949-1966, a roll on/roll off car ferry, originally SS Leicestershire. Lost in a storm with about 220 deaths out of about 260 aboard; one of the greatest maritime disasters in Greek history.

== See also ==
- Heracleum (disambiguation)
- Heracles (disambiguation)
- Iraklis (disambiguation)
- Heracleon
