= Heraclea (epic poem) =

Poem by Panyassis describing the 12 Labors of Heracles

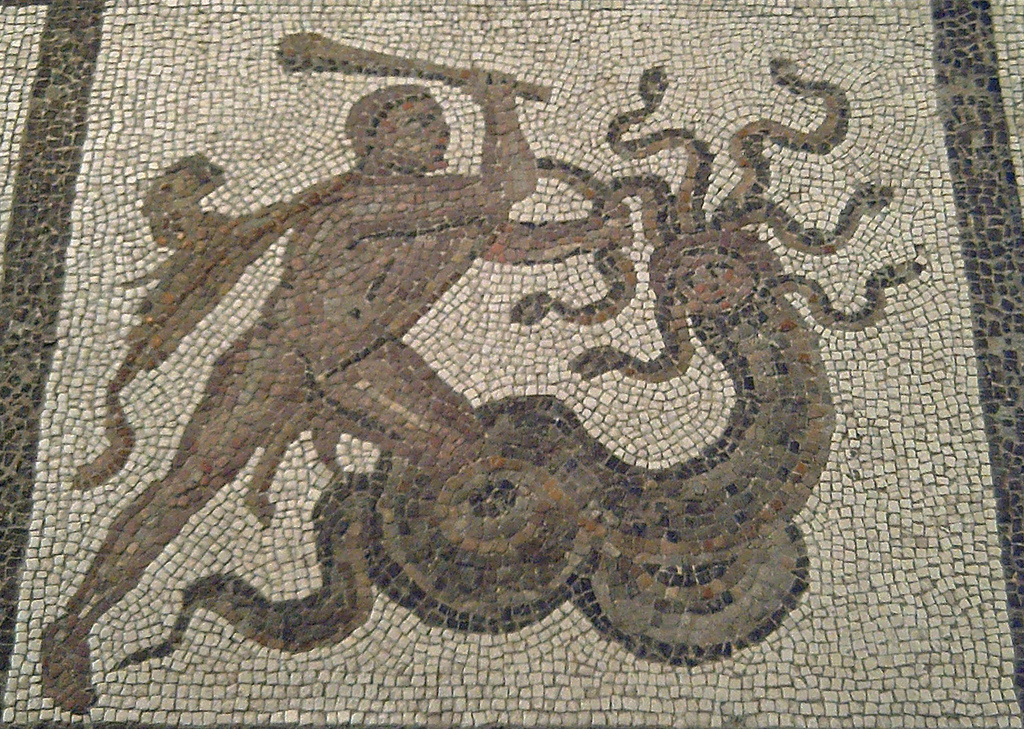
Roman mosaic of Heracles slaying the Lernaean Hydra

The Heraclea (Ancient Greek: Ἡράκλεια, Hērákleia; lit. '[exploits] of Heracles') is a lost ancient Greek epic poem written by Panyassis of Halicarnassus in the 5th century BC. It was one of the most significant epics of its time, spanning 14 books and roughly 9,000 verses in dactylic hexameter.

== Overview ==
The poem provided a comprehensive account of the life and mythical adventures of the hero Heracles. Although it only survives in about 30–60 fragmentary verses preserved by later authors like Athenaeus and Pausanias, ancient critics held Panyassis in extremely high regard. The Alexandrian canon often ranked him as one of the five greatest epic poets, sometimes second only to Homer.

== Structure and Content ==
Modern scholarship and ancient references suggest a linear narrative covering the hero's entire career:

- Early Life and Labors: The epic likely began with the madness of Heracles and the murder of his children, leading to his purification and the famous Twelve Labours performed for King Eurystheus.
  Book 1: Included the murder of his family and a visit to the Delphic Oracle.
  Book 5: Contained the labor of the cattle of Geryon and his journey to the west.
  Other Labors: Fragments confirm accounts of the Nemean Lion, the Lernaean Hydra, and the trip to the Underworld to capture Cerberus.
- Later Adventures: The latter half of the poem (Books 7–14) likely focused on "parerga" (side deeds) and his later military exploits.
  Oechalia: A major portion featured his dispute with King Eurytus and his love for Iole.
  Lydian Servitude: The poem detailed his time as a slave to Queen Omphale, where he famously took on feminine tasks and dress.
  Divine Conflicts: It famously included a scene where Heracles fought and wounded the goddess Hera.

== Style and Legacy ==
Panyassis is noted for his "eloquent" and "humanized" portrayal of Heracles. Unlike earlier versions where Heracles was purely a monster-slayer, Panyassis added ethical depth, showing the hero as an enduring figure who used dialogue and philosophy, particularly in a famous sequence advocating for moderation in wine consumption.
