= Lygdamis I of Halicarnassus =

Tyrant of Achaemenid Caria from c.520 to 484 BCE

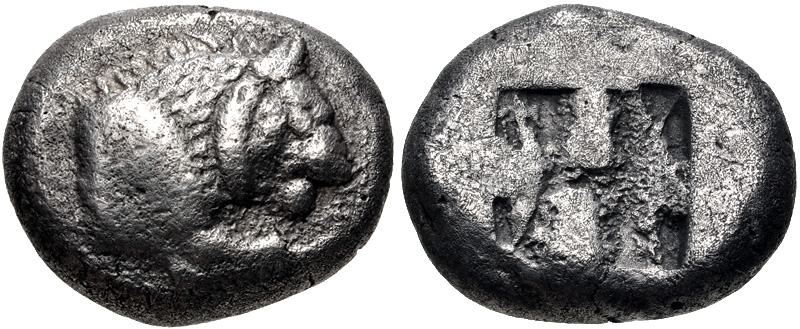
Coinage of Mylasa, Caria, at the time of Lygdamis, c. 520–490 BCE.

Lygdamis (Greek: Λύγδαμις), who ruled c. 520–484 BCE, was the first tyrant of Caria under the Achaemenid Empire. He was of Carian-Greek ethnicity. He was the father of Artemisia I of Caria.

He is the founder of the eponymous Lygdamid dynasty (520–450 BCE) of Carian tyrants, who ruled from Halicarnassus.
