= Heracleium (Ionia) =

Town of ancient Ionia

Coordinates: 37°40′55″N 27°09′43″E

Heracleium or Herakleion (Ancient Greek: Ἡράκλειον) was a town of ancient Ionia.

Its site is located above Kavaklı, Asiatic Turkey.
