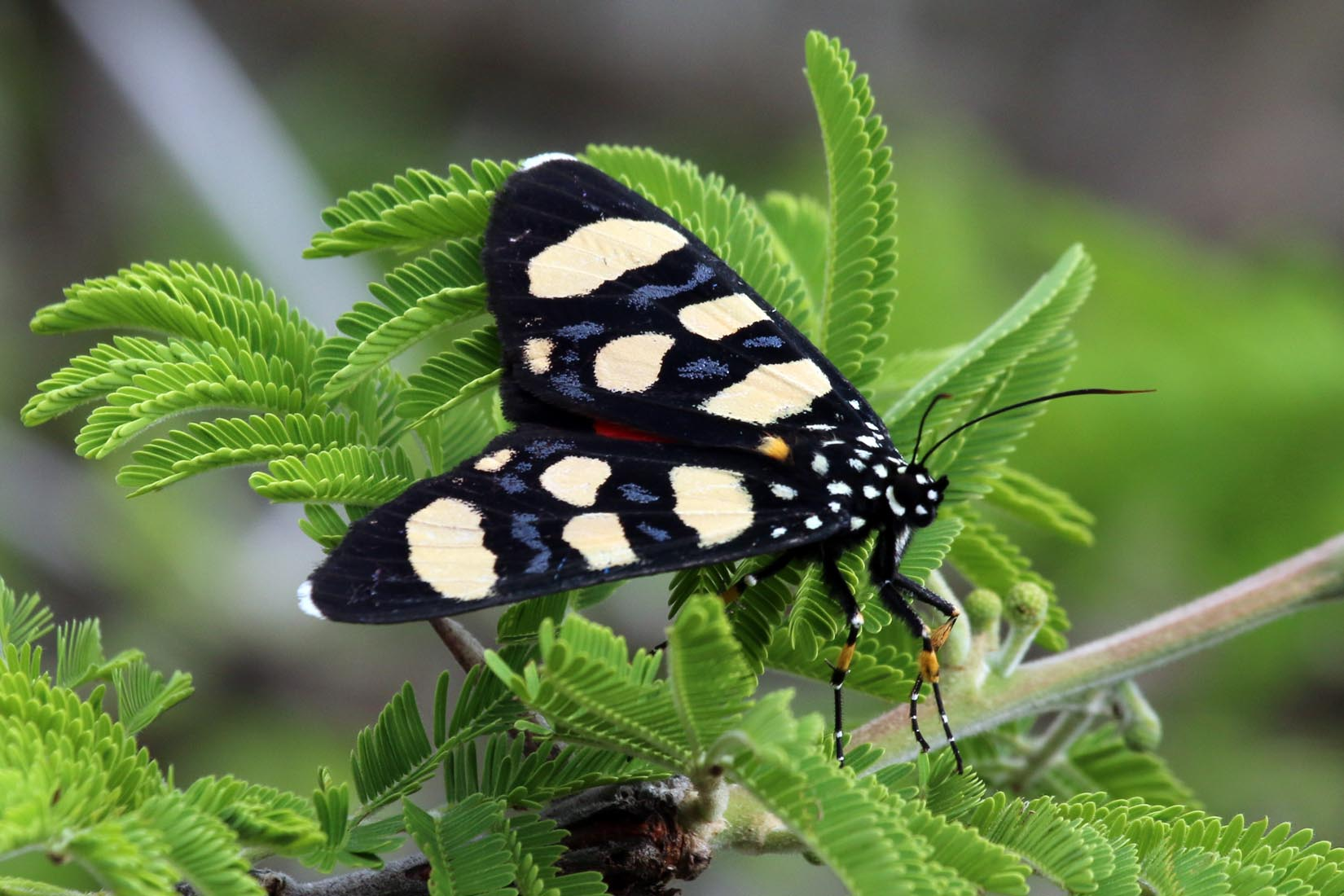
- Superb false tiger moth (Heraclia superba), Phinda Private Game Reserve, KwaZulu Natal, South Africa
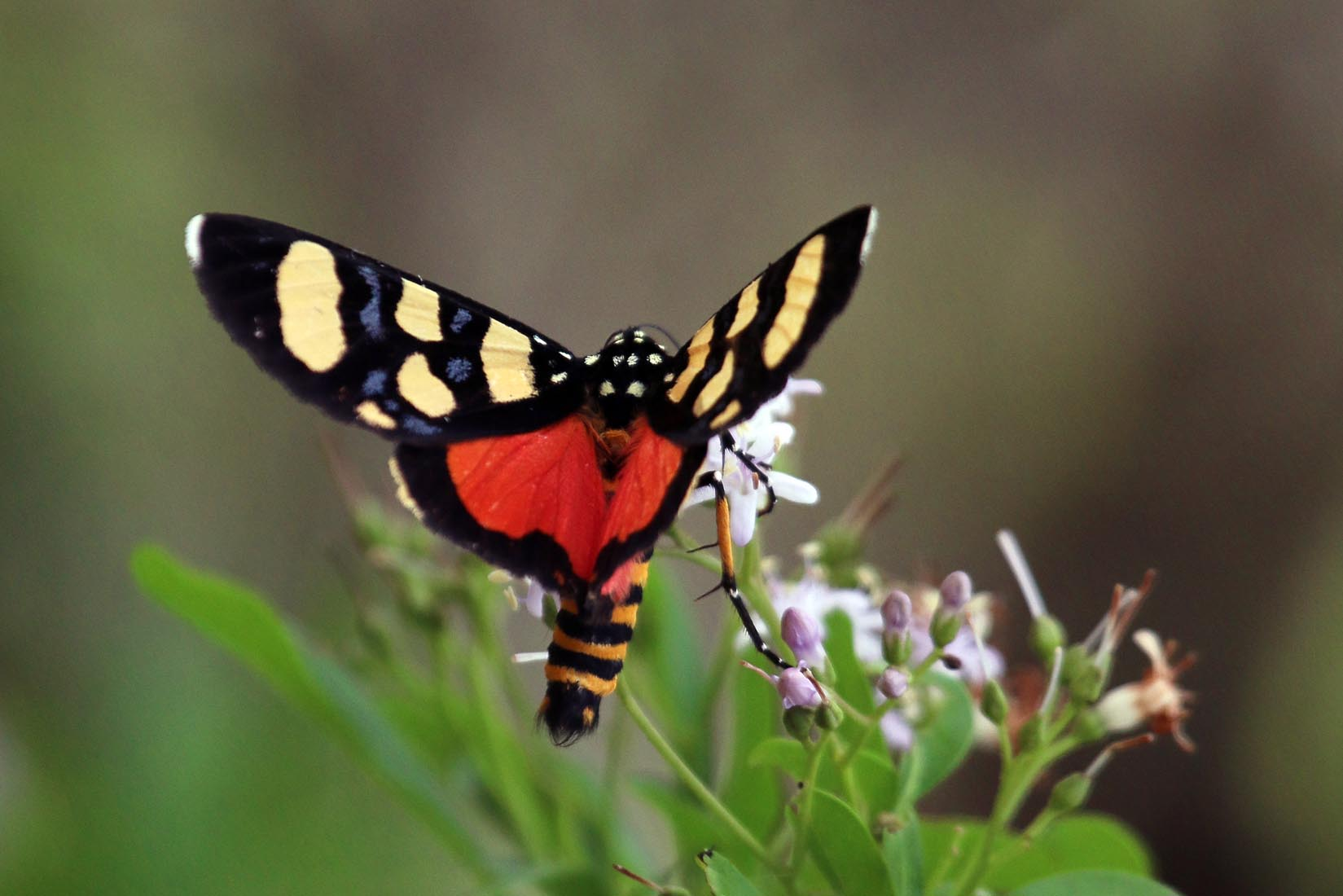
- Heraclia superba in flight

Scientific classification
- Domain: Eukaryota
- Kingdom: Animalia
- Phylum: Arthropoda
- Class: Insecta
- Order: Lepidoptera
- Superfamily: Noctuoidea
- Family: Noctuidae
- Subfamily: Agaristinae
- Genus: Heraclia; Hübner, [1820]

Synonyms
- Xanthospilopteryx Wallengren, 1858

= Heraclia (moth) =

Genus of moths

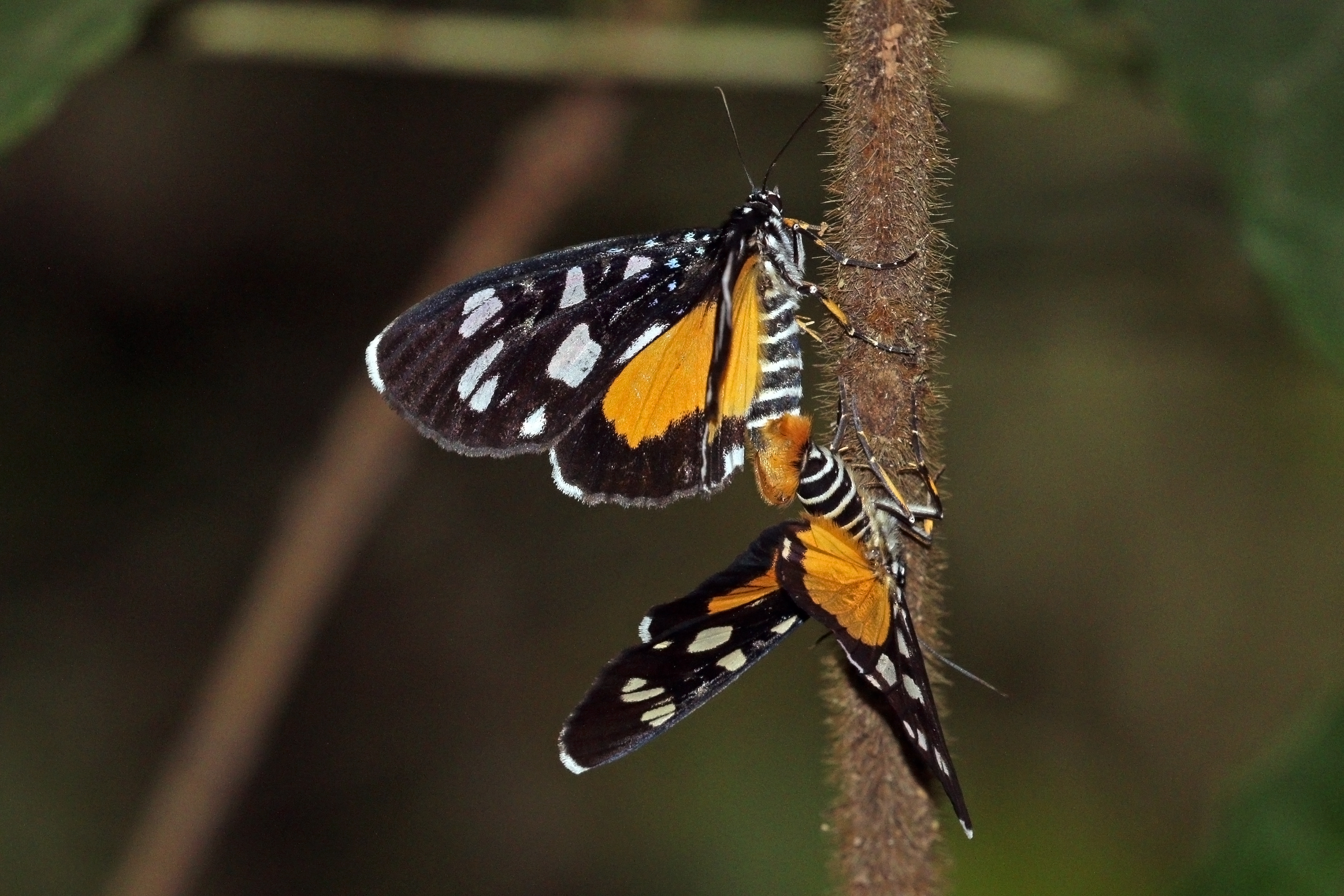
False tiger moth (Heraclia aemulatrix) mating, Ghana

Heraclia is a genus of moths of the family Noctuidae. The genus was erected by Jacob Hübner in 1820.

== Species ==
- Heraclia abacata (Karsch, 1892)
- Heraclia aemulatrix (Westwood, 1881)
- Heraclia africana (Butler, 1875)
- Heraclia aisha (Kirby, 1891)
- Heraclia annulata (Aurivillius, 1925)
- Heraclia atrifusa (Hampson, 1912)
- Heraclia atriventralis (Hampson, 1910)
- Heraclia aurantiaca Kiriakoff, 1975
- Heraclia aurea (Wichgraf, 1918)
- Heraclia bucholzi (Plötz, 1880)
- Heraclia butleri (Walker, 1869)
- Heraclia catori (Jordan, 1904)
- Heraclia contigua (Walker, 1854)
- Heraclia deficiens (Mabille, 1891)
- Heraclia durbania (Stoneham, 1963)
- Heraclia elongata (Bartel, 1903)
- Heraclia flavipennis (Bartel, 1903)
- Heraclia flavisignata (Hampson, 1912)
- Heraclia geryon (Fabricius, 1781)
- Heraclia gruenbergi (Wichgraf, 1911)
- Heraclia hornimani (Druce, 1880)
- Heraclia houyjensis (Wichgraf, 1918)
- Heraclia hypercompoides (Butler, 1895)
- Heraclia jacksoni Kiriakoff, 1975
- Heraclia jugans (Jordan, 1913)
- Heraclia karschii (Holland, 1897)
- Heraclia kivuensis Kiriakoff, 1973
- Heraclia limbomaculata (Strand, 1909)
- Heraclia lomata (Karsch, 1892)
- Heraclia longipennis (Walker, 1854)
- Heraclia medeba (Druce, 1880)
- Heraclia monslunensis (Hampson, 1901)
- Heraclia mozambica (Mabille, 1890)
- Heraclia nandi Kiriakoff, 1974
- Heraclia nigridorsa (Mabille, 1890)
- Heraclia nobela Kiriakoff, 1974
- Heraclia pallida (Walker, 1854)
- Heraclia pampata Kiriakoff, 1974
- Heraclia pardalina (Walker, 1869)
- Heraclia perdix (Druce, 1887)
- Heraclia poggei (Dewitz, 1879)
- Heraclia superba (Butler, 1875) – superb false tiger moth
- Heraclia terminatis (Walker, 1856)
- Heraclia thruppi (Butler, [1886])
- Heraclia viettei Kiriakoff, 1973
- Heraclia xanthopyga (Mabille, 1890)
- Heraclia zenkeri (Karsch, 1895)
