= Heracleium (Pontus) =

Ancient town in Anatolia

Coordinates: 41°14′44″N 37°01′33″E

Heracleium or Herakleion (Ancient Greek: Ἡράκλειον), also known as Lamyron (Λαμυρών), was a port town of ancient Pontus, on the Black Sea, between Amisus and Polemonium. It was situated on a promontory of the same name called Herakleios akra (Ἡράκλειος ἄκρα) by Strabo, and Herakleous Akron (Ἡρακλέους ἄκρον) by Ptolemy).

Its site is north of the mouth of the Terme River, Anatolia.
