= Panyassis =

5th-century BC Greek epic poet

- Πανύασσις
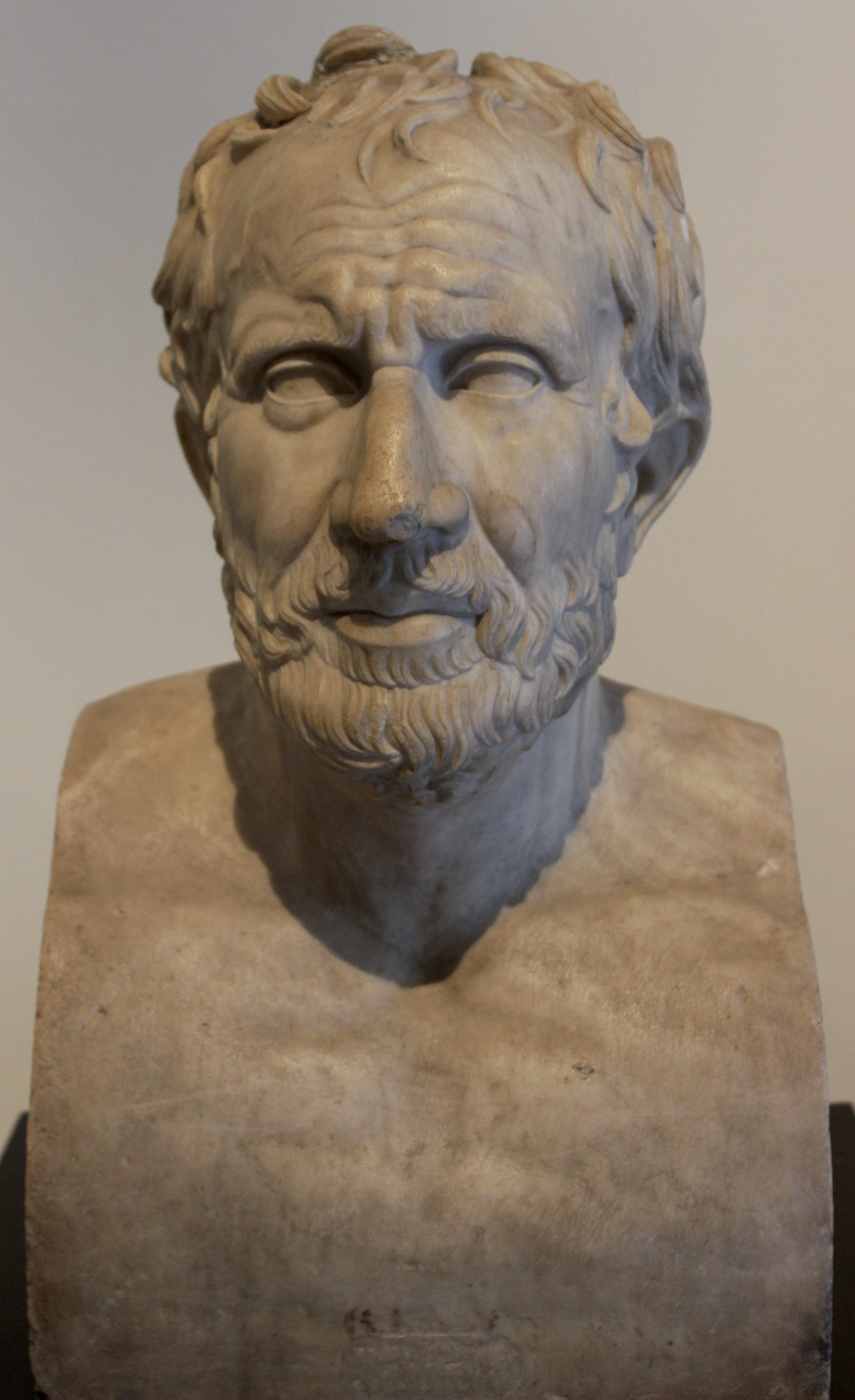
- Bust of Panyassis
- Born: 5th century BC; Halicarnassus, Caria, Asia Minor, Persian Empire (modern-day Bodrum, Muğla, Turkey)
- Died: 454 BC; Halicarnassus
- Cause of death: Executed
- Occupation: Poet
- Notable work: Heraclea; Ionica
- Relatives: Herodotus (nephew or cousin)

Panyassis of Halicarnassus (Ancient Greek: Πανύασσις ὁ Ἁλικαρνασσεύς), sometimes called Panyasis (Πανύασις), was a 5th-century BC Greek epic poet from Halicarnassus in the Persian Empire (modern-day Bodrum, Turkey).

== Life ==
Panyassis was the son of Polyarchus (Ancient Greek: Πολύαρχος) from Halicarnassus, but the historian Duris of Samos claimed that Panyasis was the son of Diocles (Ancient Greek: Διοκλῆς) and from Samos. In addition, the historian Herodotus was either his nephew or his cousin. There was also another person of the same name, possibly the grandson of the poet, who wrote a work in two books on dreams.

In 454 BC, Panyassis was executed for political activities by the tyrant of Halicarnassus and grandson of Artemisia, Lygdamis ΙΙ (Λύγδαμις), after an unsuccessful uprising against him.

Panyasis was ranked by the Alexandrian School with the great epic poets.

The Suda encyclopedia mentions Panyassis.

== Works ==
Panyassis enjoyed relatively little critical appreciation during his lifetime, but was posthumously recognised as one of the greatest poets of archaic Greece. His most famous works are: the Heraclea (Ancient Greek: Ἡράκλεια) about the hero Heracles, written in epic hexameter, and the Ionica (Ancient Greek: Ἰωνικά) about the histories of the Ionian cities of Asia Minor, reportedly written in pentameter. These works are preserved today only in fragments. It is believed that he also wrote other works which have since been lost.
