= Heracleium (Bithynia) =

Town of Bithynia

Coordinates: 40°42′03″N 29°39′47″E

Heracleium or Herakleion (Ancient Greek: Ἡράκλειον) was a town of Bithynia, on the Propontis.

Its site is located near modern Ereğli, Asiatic Turkey.
