= Heraclea (Athamania) =

Heraclea, Heracleia, or Herakleia (Ancient Greek: Ἡράκλεια) was a fortress town of Athamania.
