= Heraclea Salbace =

Town of ancient Caria

Coordinates: 37°37′21″N 28°59′09″E

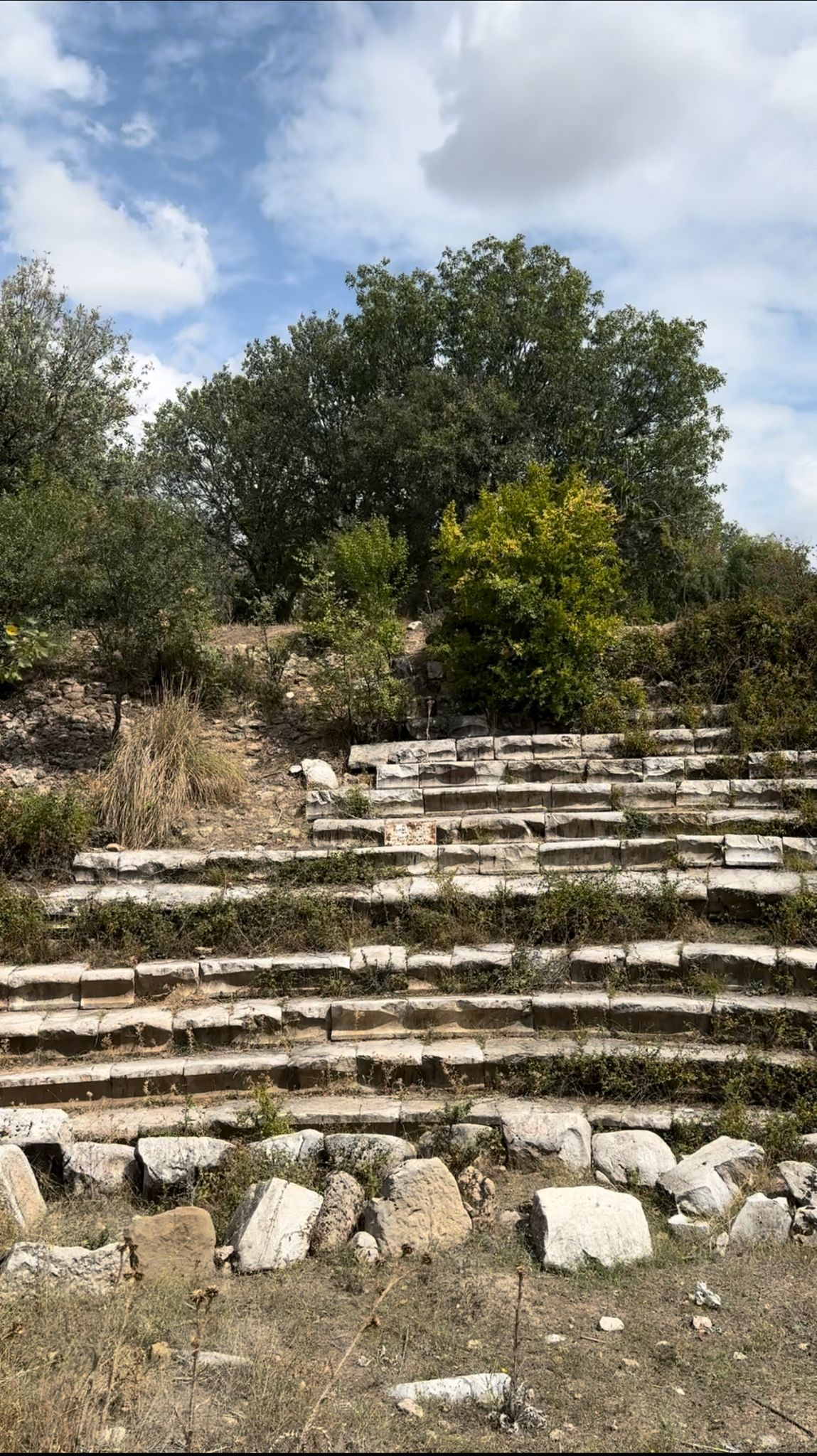
Hereclea Salbace

Heraclea Salbace (Ancient Greek: Ἡράκλεια Σαλβάκη, romanized: Herakleia Salbake), Heraclea Salbaces (Ἡράκλεια Σαλβάκης - Herakleia Salbakes), Heraclea ad Albanum (Ἡράκλεια πρὸς Ἀλβανῷ - Herakleia pros Albano), or Heraclea Albace (Ἡράκλεια Ἀλβάκη), or simply Heraclea or Herakleia (Ἡράκλεια), also transliterated as Heracleia, was a town of ancient Caria.

Suda mentioned that there was a grammarian from the city who wrote many books and was called Diogenianus (Διογενειανός) (but it may be an error and it means the Diogenianus from Heraclea Pontica).

The place must have Christianised early as an early bishopric is attested. Bishop Polychronius represented the town at the Council of Ephesus. No longer a residential see, it remains a titular see of the Roman Catholic Church.

Its site is located near Vakıf, Asiatic Turkey.
