= SS Manganese =

German trading vessel

History
- Name: Wiedau (1925-45); Empire Contract (1945); Herakleion (1945-48); Laconia (1948-65); Manganese (1965-93)
- Owner: Bugsier Reederei & Berugungs AG (1925-45); Ministry of War Transport (1945); Greek Government (1945-48); Lakoniki Steamship Navigation Co (1948-54); Hellenic Levant Line (1954-64); J Alexatos (1965-65); Sinai Manganese Co (1965-93)
- Operator: Bugsier Reederei & Berugungs AG (1925-45); G Gibson & Co Ltd (1945); Greek Government (1945-48); I Tsengas & Co (1948-54); Hellenic Levant Line (1954-64); J Alexatos (1965-65); Sinai Manganese Co (1965-93)
- Port of registry: (Weimar Republic) Hamburg (1925–33); (Nazi Germany) Hamburg (1933-45); (United Kingdom) London (1945); (Greece) Antwerp (1945-65); United Arab Republic (1965–71); Egypt (1971-93)
- Builder: Norderwerft AG
- Yard number: 605
- Launched: 1925
- Completed: May 1925
- Identification: Code Letters RFLK (1925-33); Code Letters DHZV (1933-45); Code Letters GJDY (1945); United Kingdom Official Number 180593 (1945)
- Fate: Scrapped

General characteristics
- Class & type: Coaster
- Tonnage: 964 GRT; 471 NRT
- Length: 221 ft 0 in (67.36 m)
- Beam: 35 ft 1 in (10.69 m)
- Depth: 13 ft 0 in (3.96 m)
- Installed power: Triple expansion steam engine
- Propulsion: Screw propeller
- Speed: 10 knots (19 km/h)

Manganese was a 964 GRT coaster that was built in 1925 by Norderwerft AG, Hamburg, Germany as Wiedau for German owners. She was seized by the Allies in May 1945, passed to the Ministry of War Transport (MoWT) and was renamed Empire Contract. Later that year, she was transferred to Greece and renamed Herakleion. She was sold into merchant service in 1948 and renamed Laconia. In 1965, she was sold to Egypt and renamed Manganese. The ship was deleted from Lloyd's Register in 1993.

== Description ==
The ship was built in 1925 by Norderwerft AG, Hamburg, as yard number 605. She was completed in May 1925.

The ship was 221 feet 0 inches (67.36 m) long, with a beam of 35 feet 1 inch (10.69 m) and a depth of 13 feet 0 inches (3.96 m). The ship was of 964 GRT, 471 NRT,

The ship was propelled by a triple expansion steam engine, which had cylinders of 16 1/2 inches (42 cm), 25 3/5 inches (65 cm) and 43 1/2 inches (110 cm) diameter by 27 3/5 inches (70 cm) stroke. The engine was built by Dresdner Maschinenbau & Schiffs Uegibau AG, Dresden. It could propel the ship at 10 knots (19 km/h).

== History ==
Wiedau was built for the Bugsier Line, Hamburg. The Code Letters RFLK were allocated. In 1934, her code letters were changed to DHZV.

In May 1945, Wiedau was seized by the Allies at Hamburg. She was passed to the MoWT and renamed Empire Contract. Her port of registry was changed to London. The Code Letters GJDY and United Kingdom Official Number 180593 were allocated. She was placed under the management of G Gibson & Son Ltd. Later that year, she was transferred to the Greek Government and was renamed Herakleion.

In 1948, Herakleion was sold to the Lakoniki Steamship Navigation Co and was renamed Laconia. She was operated under the management of I Tsengas & Co, serving until 1954 when she was sold to the Hellenic Levant Line. In 1964, Laconia was sold to J Alexatos. In 1965, she was sold to the Sinai Manganese Co, Egypt and was renamed Manganese. The ship was deleted from Lloyd's Register in 1993.
