= Heraclea (Lydia) =

Ancient town in modern day Turkey

Coordinates: 38°36′54″N 27°10′09″E

Heraclea or Herakleia (Ἡράκλεια), also transliterated as Heracleia, was a town of ancient Lydia at the foot of Mount Sipylus. From this town magnets were known as Heracleus lapis.

Its site is tentatively located near Emiralem, Asiatic Turkey.
