= Ereğli =

Ereğli (formerly Erekli) is a Turkish toponym derived from Ancient Greek Ἡράκλεια (Herakleia), in Latin Heraclea or Heraclia, named after the hero-born god Heracles. It may refer to:

- Karadeniz Ereğli, a city and its district in Zonguldak Province, Turkey
- Konya Ereğlisi, a city and its district in Konya Province, Turkey
- Marmara Ereğlisi, a city and its district in Tekirdağ Province, European Turkey, formerly archbishopric Heraclea in Europa, a Latin Catholic titular see
- Ereğli, a small town in Karamürsel district of Kocaeli Province in Turkey

Locally, they are all simply called "Ereğli".
