= Heraclea (Mygdonia) =

Heraclea or Herakleia (Ancient Greek: Ἡράκλεια) was a town of Mygdonia in ancient Macedonia. It is mainly known by Greek epigraphic sources, the oldest of which belongs to the 4th century BCE and the rest are from the Hellenistic and Roman periods. It is also cited by Stephanus of Byzantium, who places it in Kingdom of Macedonia.

It has been suggested that it could have been located on the eastern margin of the river Axios, northwest of Thessaloniki, in the modern Agios Athanasios.
