= Lygdamis II of Halicarnassus =

5th-century BCE tyrant of Achaemenid Caria

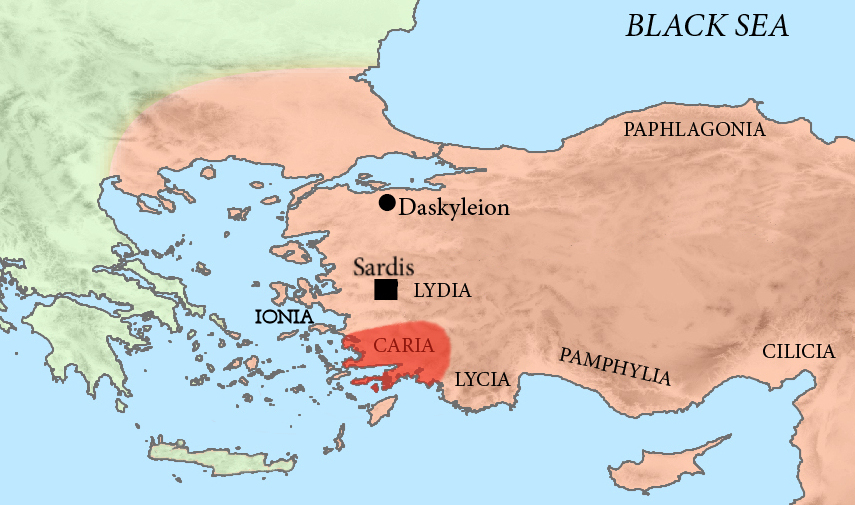
Lygdamis II was tyrant of Caria, under the rule of the Achaemenid Empire.

Lygdamis II (Greek: Λύγδαμις) (ruled c.460-454 BCE) was a tyrant of Caria during the 5th century BCE, under the Achaemenid Empire. His capital was in Halicarnassus. He was the grandson of Artemisia, and son of Pisindelis, the previous tyrant.

Lygdamis assassinated the poet Panyassis, uncle of famous historian Herodotus, in 461, which forced Herodotus to leave his native city of Halicarnassus, fleeing to the island of Samos.

After the death of Lygdamis, circa 454 BCE, Halicarnassus joined the Athenian alliance, known as the Delian League. At that time, Halicarnassus started to appear on the Athenian tribute quota lists.

From 395 BCE, Caria would again fall under the control of the Achaemenid Empire and be ruled by a new dynasty of local tyrants, the Hecatomnids.
