= Heracleium =

Ancient harbor town of Crete in Greece

Coordinates: 35°20′27″N 25°08′00″E

Heracleium or Herakleion (Ancient Greek: Ἡράκλειον), also known as Heracleia or Herakleia (Ἡράκλεια), or Heracleopolis was a town in ancient Crete, which Strabo calls the port of Knossos, and was situated, according to the anonymous coast-describer (Stadiasmus), at a distance of 20 stadia from that city. Stephanus of Byzantium simply mentions the town as the 17th of the 23 Heracleias he enumerates. Although the ecclesiastical notices make no mention of this place as a bishop's see, yet there is found among the subscriptions to the proceedings of the Second Council of Nicaea, along with other Cretan prelates, Theodoros, bishop of Heracleopolis.

The site of Heracleium is located within the modern Heraklion. The ancient port town gave its name to the modern city of Heraklion, which revived the historical name during the 19th century.
