= List of ship launches in the 1640s =

The list of ship launches in the 1640s includes a chronological list of some ships launched from 1640 to 1649.

	Ship	Class / type	Builder	Location	Country	Notes
1641	Lune	Ship of the line	Jan Gron	Île d'Indret	Kingdom of France	For French Navy.
1641	Swan	Full-rigged ship			England	For English Navy.
1642	Léopard	Ship of the line	Jan Gron	Île d'Indret	Kingdom of France	For French Navy.
1642	Soleil	Ship of the Line	Jan Gron	Île d'Indret	Kingdom of France	For French Navy.
1642	Tigre	Ship of the Line	Jan Gron	Île d'Indret	Kingdom of France	For French Navy.
1644	Brederode	Ship of the line	Jan Salomonszoon van den Tempel	Rotterdam	Dutch Republic	For Dutch Navy
1645	Constant Warwick	Fourth rate	Peter Pett Sr.	Ratcliff	England	For English Navy.
1646	Adventure	Fourth rate	Peter Pett	Woolwich Dockyard	England	For English Navy.
1646	Assurance	Fourth rate	Peter Pett	Woolwich Dockyard	England	For English Navy.
1646	Nonsuch	Fourth rate	Peter Pett Sr.	Deptford Dockyard	England	For English Navy
1647	Dragon	Fourth rate	Henry Goddard	Chatham Dockyard	England	For English Navy.
1647	Elizabeth	Merchantman	Peter Pett Sr.	Woolwich Dockyard	England	For private owner.
1647	Phoenix	Fourth rate	Peter Pett	Woolwich	England	For English Navy
1647	Tyger	Fourth rate	Peter Pett	Woolwich	England	For English Navy
1640s	Katherine	Merchantman			England	For private owner.
1640s	Unnamed	Botik			Unknown	For Michael of Russia
