= French ship Soleil (1642) =

Ship of the line of the French Navy

History

France
- Name: Soleil
- Namesake: The sun
- Owner: French Royal Navy
- Builder: "Jean de Werth" (real name Jan Gron), in Île d'Indret Dockyard
- Laid down: 1640
- Launched: 1642
- Completed: 1643
- Fate: Sold to break up in August 1672

General characteristics
- Class & type: ship of the line
- Tonnage: 700 tons
- Length: 117 French feet (Note: The (pre-metric) French foot was 6.575% longer than the equivalent English foot.)
- Beam: 29½ French feet
- Draught: 13 French feet
- Depth of hold: 12 French feet
- Decks: 2 gun decks
- Complement: 275, +5 officers
- Armament: 38 guns: 4 × 18-pounder long guns + 18 × 12-pounder long guns on lower deck; 10 × 8-pounder long guns + 6 × 7-pounder or 5-pounder long guns on upper deck
- Armour: Timber

Soleil was a 38-gun ship of the line of the French Royal Navy, designed by Deviot and constructed by the Dutch shipwright Jan Gron (usually called Jean de Werth in French) at the new state dockyard at Île d'Indret near Nantes. She and her sister Lune were two-deckers, with a mixture of bronze guns on both gun decks.

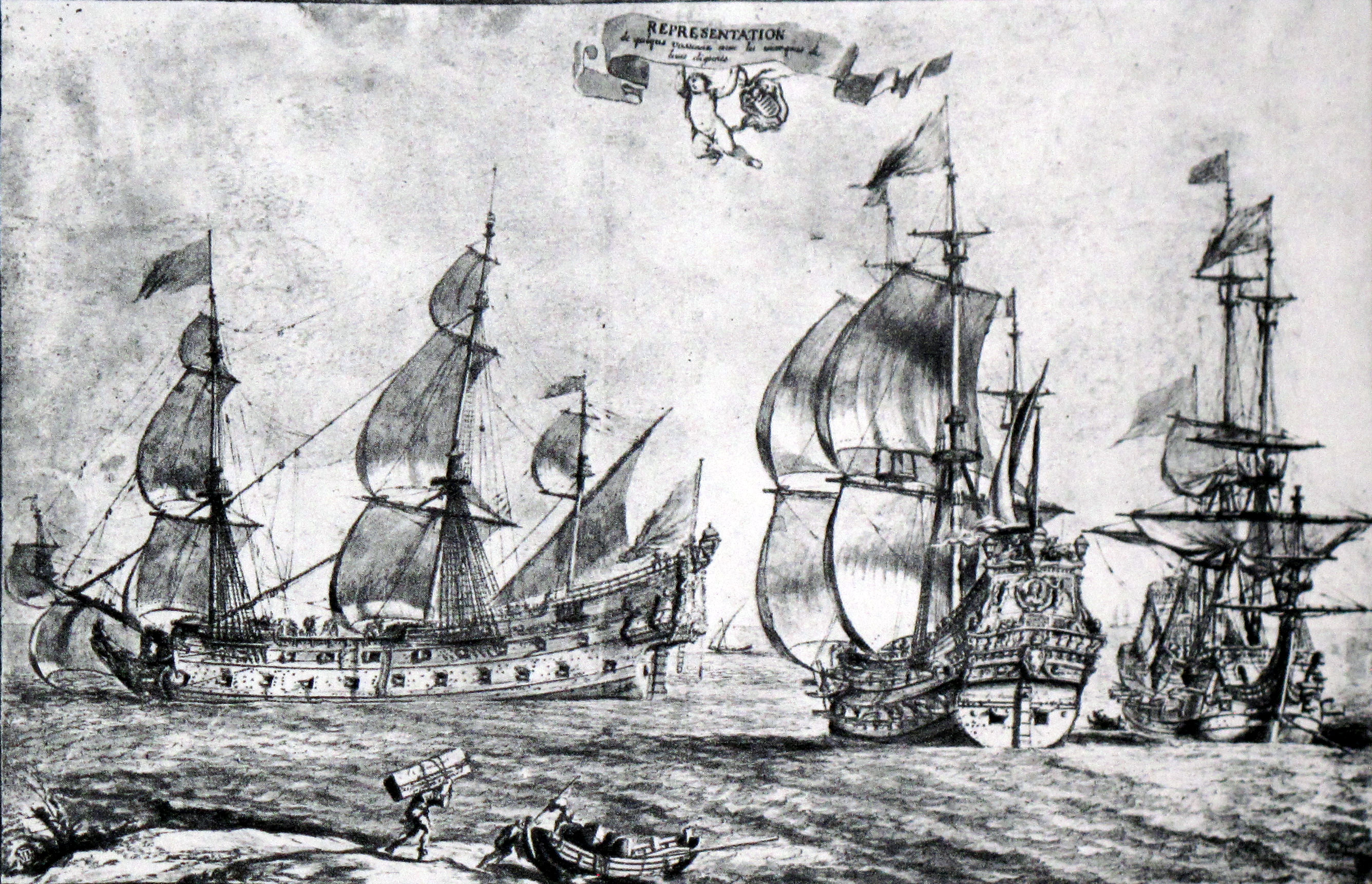
French ships of the line; Lune, Reine, and Jupiter in 1654

Soleil took part in the Battle of Orbitello on 14 June 1646, as the flagship of Chef d'escadre Marquis de Montigny, and in the Battle of Castellammare on 21/22 December 1647. By 1671 she had been re-armed with twenty-two 12-pounders on the lower deck and fourteen 8-pounders on the upper deck. She was renamed Hercule on 24 June 1671, then quickly renamed Marquis 23 days later. She was condemned on 28 June 1672 and sold in August to be taken to pieces.
