= French ship Lune (1641) =

Ship of the line of the French Navy (1641-1664)

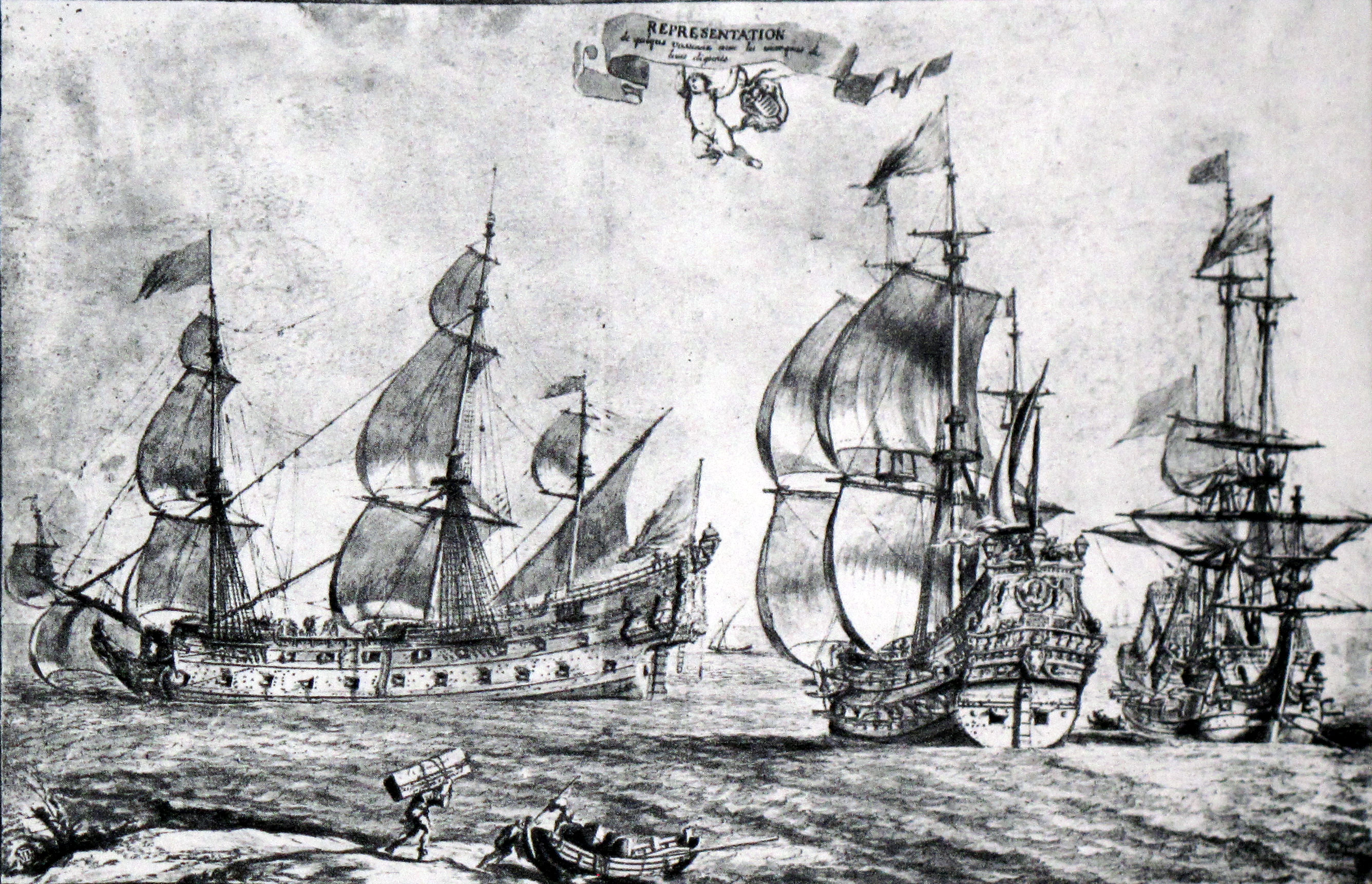
- French ships of the line; la Lune, la Reine, and le Jupiter in 1654

History

France
- Name: Lune
- Namesake: The moon
- Owner: French Royal Navy
- Builder: "Jean de Werth" (real name Jan Gron), in Île d'Indret Dockyard
- Laid down: 1640
- Launched: 1641
- Completed: 1642
- Fate: Sank 9 November 1664

General characteristics
- Class & type: ship of the line
- Tonnage: 700 tons
- Length: 117 French feet (Note: The (pre-metric) French foot was 6.575% longer than the equivalent English foot.)
- Beam: 29½ French feet
- Draught: 13 French feet
- Depth of hold: 12 French feet
- Decks: 2 gun decks
- Complement: 275, +5 officers
- Armament: 38 guns: 4 × 18-pounder long guns + 18 × 12-pounder long guns on lower deck; 10 × 8-pounder long guns + 6 × 7-pounder or 5-pounder long guns on upper deck
- Armour: Timber

Lune was a 38-gun ship of the line of the French Royal Navy, the first ship of the line to be built at the new state dockyard at Île d'Indret near Nantes, designed by Deviot and constructed by the Dutch shipwright Jan Gron (usually called Jean de Werth in French). She and her sister Soleil were two-deckers, with a mixture of bronze guns on both gun decks. Lune took part in the Battle of Orbetello on 14 June 1646, as the flagship of Vice-amiral Louis Foucault de Saint-Germain-Beaupré, Comte de Daugnon, in the Battle of Castellammare on 21/22 December 1647, and in the Battle of Pertuis d'Antioche on 8 August 1652. She sailed on 9 November 1664 from Toulon for the Hyères Islands while carrying troops of the 1st Regiment of Picardy, but a half-hour after sailing she suddenly broke apart at the head and sank "like a marble", with only 60 survivors from over 600 aboard. The wreck of Lune was rediscovered by Paul-Henri Nargeolet on 15 May 1993.
