= French ship Léopard (1642) =

Ship of the line of the French Navy

History

France
- Name: Léopard
- Namesake: Leopard
- Owner: French Royal Navy
- Builder: "Jean de Werth" (real name Jan Gron), in Île d'Indret Dockyard
- Laid down: 1640
- Launched: 1642
- Completed: 1644
- Fate: Delivered to Spanish by her mutinous crew in April 1651

General characteristics
- Class & type: ship of the line
- Tonnage: 300 tons
- Decks: 2 gun decks
- Complement: 170
- Armament: 28 guns:
- Armour: Timber

Léopard was a 28-gun small ship of the line of the French Royal Navy, constructed by the Dutch shipwright Jan Gron (usually called Jean de Werth in French) at the new state dockyard at Île d'Indret near Nantes. She and her sister Tigre were two-deckers, but with only a few guns on the upper deck.

In April 1651 her crew mutinied and handed the ship over to the Spanish at San Lucar.
