= French ship Tigre (1642) =

Ship of the line of the French Navy

History

France
- Name: Tigre
- Namesake: Tiger
- Owner: French Royal Navy
- Builder: "Jean de Werth" (real name Jan Gron), in Île d'Indret Dockyard
- Laid down: 1640
- Launched: 1642
- Completed: 1644
- Fate: Sank off Sardinia on 23 September 1664

General characteristics
- Class & type: ship of the line
- Tonnage: 300 tons
- Decks: 2 gun decks
- Complement: 170
- Armament: 28 guns:
- Armour: Timber

Tigre was a 28-gun small ship of the line of the French Royal Navy, constructed by the Dutch shipwright Jan Gron (usually called Jean de Werth in French) at the new state dockyard at Île d'Indret near Nantes. She and her sister Léopard were two-deckers, but with only a few guns on the upper deck.

Tigre sank off Cap de la Casse, Sardinia on 23 September 1644 while carrying material destined for Djidjelli in Algeria, with 64 men lost out of 122 aboard.

== Sources and references ==
- Roche, Jean-Michel (2005). Dictionnaire des bâtiments de la flotte de guerre française de Colbert à nos jours 1 1671 - 1870. p. 223. ISBN 978-2-9525917-0-6. OCLC 165892922.
- Nomenclature des Vaisseaux de Louis XIII et de la régence d'Anne d'Autriche, 1610 a 1661. Alain Demerliac (Editions Omega, Nice – 2004).
- The Sun King's Vessels (2015) – Jean-Claude Lemineur; English translation by François Fougerat. Editions ANCRE. ISBN 978-2903179885
- Winfield, Rif and Roberts, Stephen (2017) French Warships in the Age of Sail 1626-1786: Design, Construction, Careers and Fates. Seaforth Publishing. ISBN 978-1-4738-9351-1.
- Vaisseaux de Ligne Français de 1682 à 1780 1
