= Three-decker (disambiguation) =

A three-decker is a wooden ship having three decks, especially one of a class of sail-powered warships with guns on three decks.

Three-decker may also refer to:

== Architecture ==
- Three-decker (house), a dwelling with an apartment on each floor
- A pulpit on three levels, with different usages during a church service for each level, often found in 18th-century churches in England and restorations dating to that time

== Publishing ==
- Three-volume novel, three books by one author bound in one volume
  - The Thorne Smith Three-Decker, by Thorne Smith

== Buses ==
Triple decker bus
