= The Moonlight Battle =

Painting by Dominic Serres

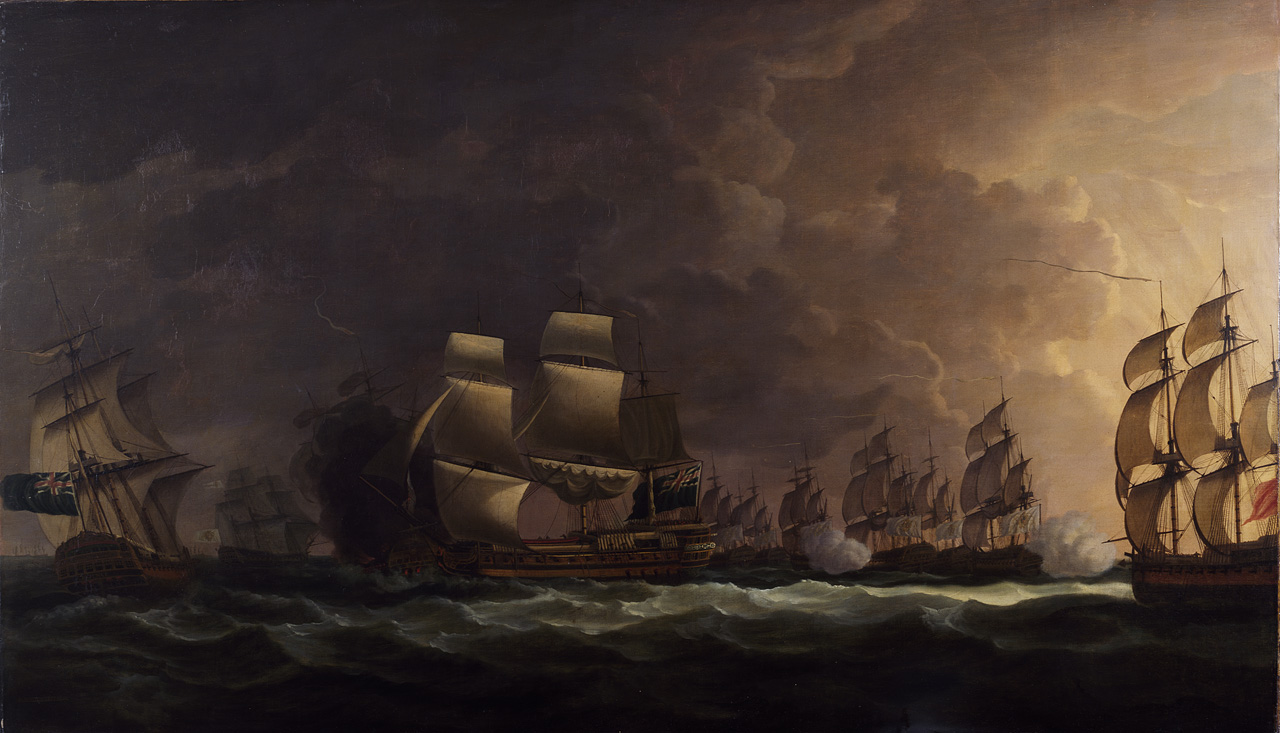
- Artist: Dominic Serres
- Year: 1781
- Medium: Oil on canvas
- Dimensions: 106.6 cm × 183 cm (42.0 in × 72 in)
- Location: National Maritime Museum, Greenwich

The Moonlight Battle is an oil on canvas history painting by the French-born British artist Dominic Serres, from 1781. Today the work is held in the National Maritime Museum in Greenwich.

== History and description ==
The painting depicts the Battle of Cape St Vincent, which fought on 16 January 1780 during the American War of Independence. Dubbed the "Moonlight Battle" as it was fought at night, the battle was part of a successful attempt by a Royal Navy fleet under Admiral of the White George Rodney to resupply the British garrison in Gibraltar during the Great Siege of Gibraltar. Rodney's fleet encountered, pursued and defeated a Spanish Navy fleet off Cádiz, capturing Admiral Juan de Lángara in the process.

Serres, a member of the Royal Academy, was known for his naval scenes. The painting takes place at the moment the San Domingo exploded. Rather than foreground Rodney's flagship HMS Sandwich it views a British two-decker is raking a Spanish ship while another British two-decker pursues Lángara's Fenix.

In 1793, Serres produced another work based on the battle, Rodney's Fleet Taking in Prizes After the Moonlight Battle, which is also in the collection at Greenwich. The battle was also painted by other marine artists including Francis Holman.

== Bibliography ==
- Gardiner, Robert. Navies and the American Revolution 1775–1783. Naval Institute Press, 1996.
- Russett, Alan. Dominic Serres, R.A., 1719–1793: War Artist to the Navy. Antique Collectors' Club, 2001.
- Willis, Sam. Fighting at Sea in the Eighteenth Century: The Art of Sailing Warfare. Boydell Press, 2008.
