= Three-decker =

Sailing warship with three covered gundecks

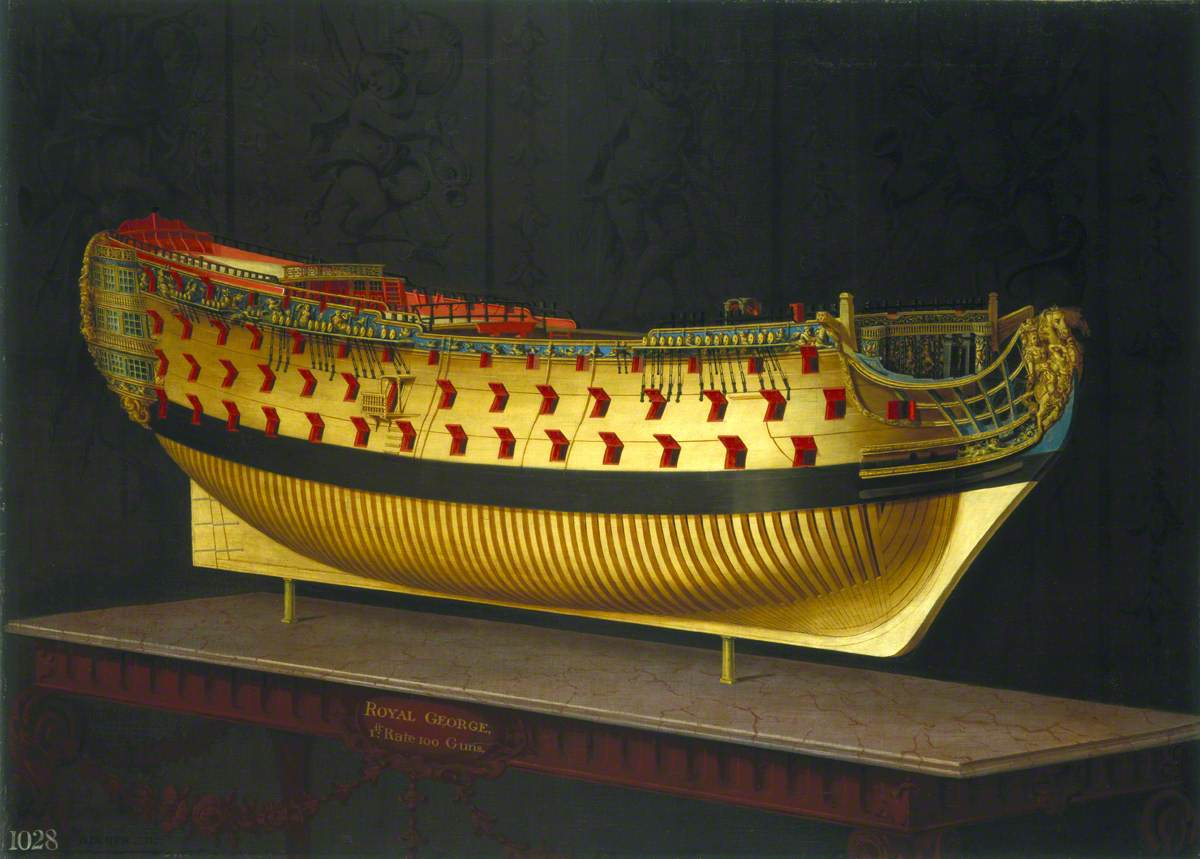
Painting of a model of the three-decker HMS Royal George

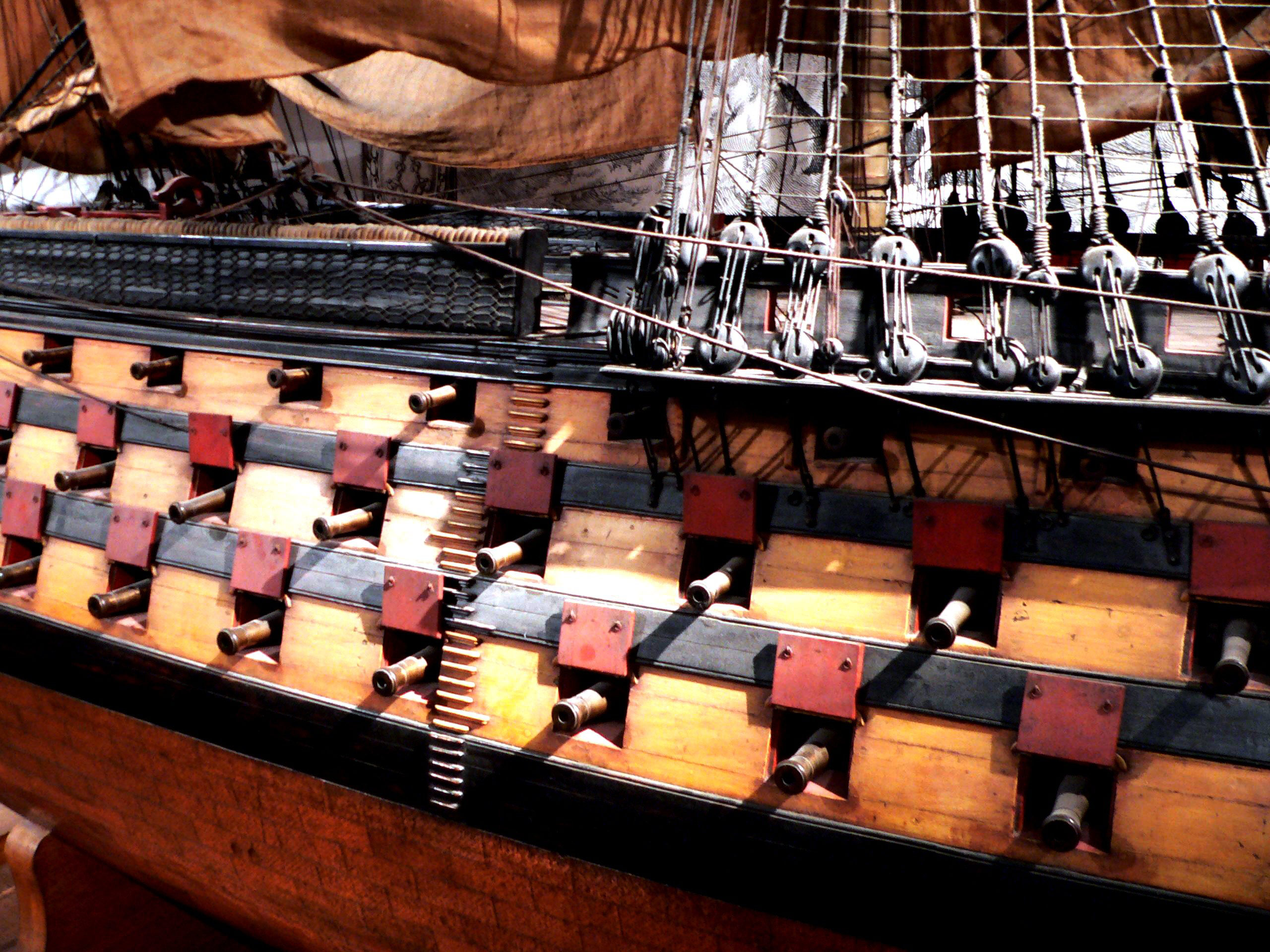
Batteries of the 118-gun Océan

A three-decker was a sailing warship which carried her principal carriage-mounted guns on three fully armed decks. Usually additional (smaller) guns were carried on the upper works (forecastle and quarterdeck), but this was not a continuous battery and so did not count as a "fourth deck". Three-deckers were usually "ships of the line", i.e. of sufficient strength to participate in the line of battle, and in the rating system of the Royal Navy were generally classed as first or second rates, although from the mid-1690s until the 1750s the larger of the third rates were also three-deckers.

Three-deckers also served in the naval forces of other European states, notably those of France, Russia and Spain. The French definition of a three-decker differed from that of the English Navy until 1690, as some ships that were officially termed "three-deckers" prior to this date had only a partially-armed third tier of guns, with a significant gap between the guns in the forward portion of that deck and the guns in the aft portion of that deck. In some of these nominal three-deckers this division constituted a structural gap separating the forward and aft sections of this deck, so that these vessels would have been described as "two-deckers" in equivalent English warships.

== Respect of a patriotic community ==
Three-deckers held special respect among the local community and the troops who farewelled these ships when they left the harbour. Such patriotism was expressed when HMS Britannia left Portsmouth bound for active service in the Mediterranean, in October 1840:

It is customary at all times for many persons to congregate on the platform when a three-decker leaves the harbour, for such an occurrence is somewhat rare; but the events connected with the necessity of reinforcing our squadron in the Mediterranean, and the contemplation of this noble ship may be called upon to take part in these measures already so gallantly begun, imparted additional interest to Britannia leaving the harbour; and on this occasion, therefore, the platform and ramparts were crowded with spectators. When the Britannia came abreast of the platform at 11 o'clock, the hour at which the troops appointed for the day's duty are inspected prior to their marching off to their respective guards, the commanding officer ordered the troops to pile their arms and mount the ramparts ... followed by the splendid band of the 72d Regiment, and, waving their caps, spontaneously gave three hearty cheers, in which they were joined by the concourse assembled. This was repeated several times, the band continuing to play "Rule Britannia."

== See also ==
- Two-decker
