= Two-decker =

Type of warship

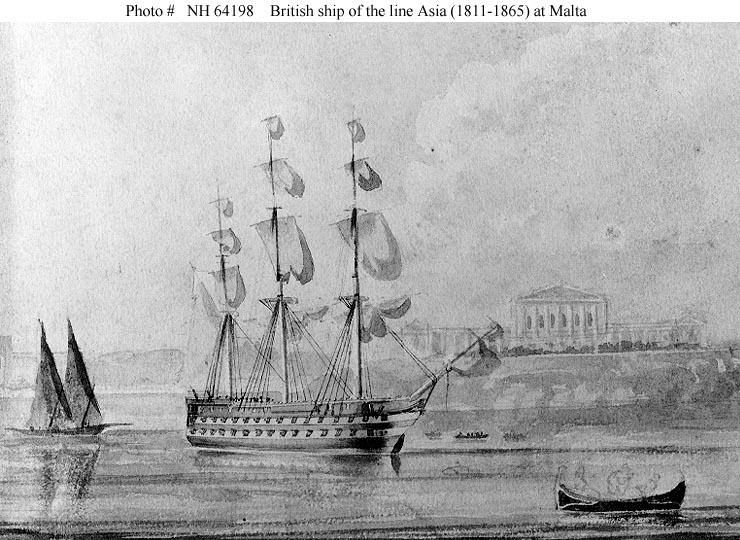
HMS Asia (1811), British 74-gun warship

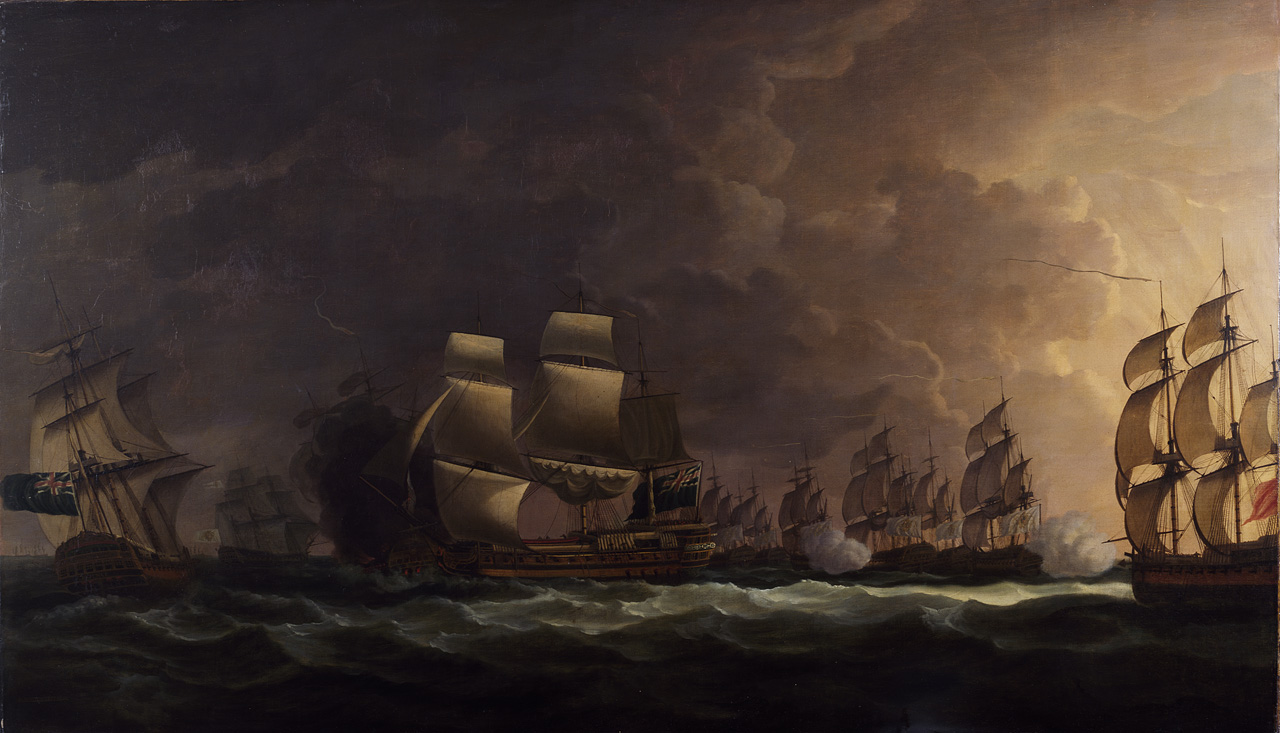
The Moonlight Battle by Dominic Serres, with a British two-decker in the foreground.

A two-decker is a sail warship which carried her guns on two fully armed decks. Usually additional guns were carried on the upper works (forecastle and quarterdeck), but this was not a continuous battery and thus not counted as a full gun deck.

Two-deckers ranged all the way from the small 40-gun Fifth rate up to 80- or even 90-gun ships of the line, with the third-rate of seventy-four guns, or "seventy-four", being the archetype.

== See also ==
- Three-decker
