= Indre, Loire-Atlantique =

Indre Aendr (Gallo) Endrez/Antr (Breton)
- Commune
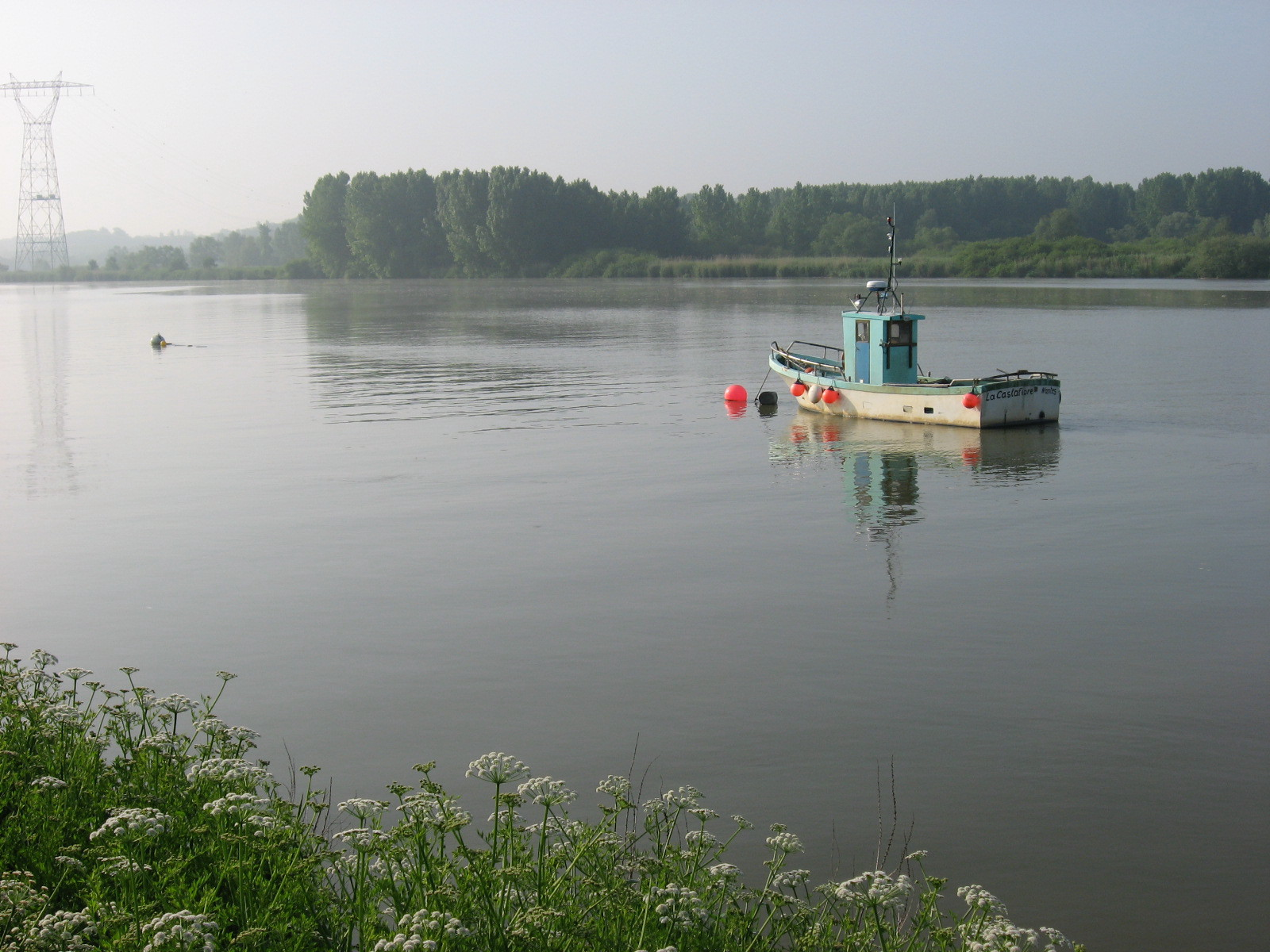
- The Loire at Basse-Indre

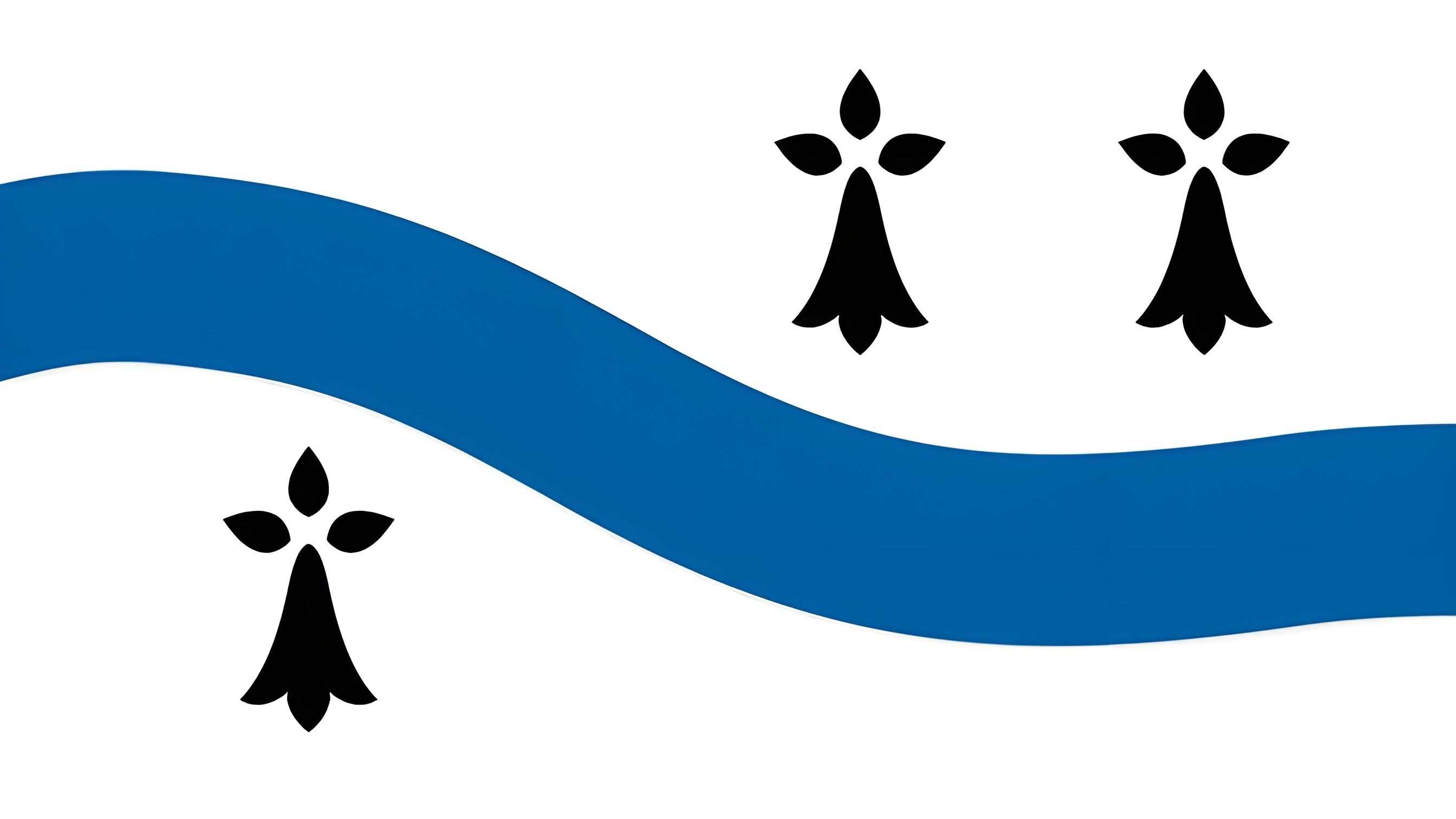
- Flag Coat of arms
- Location of Indre
- Location within France Location within Pays de la Loire
- Coordinates: 47°11′58″N 1°40′12″W
- Country: France
- Region: Pays de la Loire
- Department: Loire-Atlantique
- Arrondissement: Nantes
- Canton: Saint-Herblain-1
- Intercommunality: Nantes Métropole

Government
  - Mayor (2020–2026): Anthony Berthelot
- Area^{1}: 4.72 km^{2} (1.82 sq mi)
- Population (2023): 4,160
  - Density: 881/km^{2} (2,280/sq mi)
- Time zone: UTC+01:00 (CET)
  - Summer (DST): UTC+02:00 (CEST)
- INSEE/Postal code: 44074 /44610 (Basse-Indre and Haut-indre), 44620 (Indret)
- Dialling codes: 02
- ^{1} French Land Register data, which excludes lakes, ponds, glaciers > 1 km^{2} (0.386 sq mi or 247 acres) and river estuaries.

Indre (French pronunciation: [ɛ̃dʁ]; Gallo: Aendr, Breton: Antr or Endrez) is a commune in the Loire-Atlantique department in western France.

== Etymology ==
The name Indre, pronounced [ɛ̃dʁ] in French, derives from that of Latin Antrum. The city was called Antrum and Antrinse monasterium in 840, Andra in 1144 was renamed Aindre and Indre.

The inhabitants of Indre are known in French as indrais .

== Administration ==
=== Mayors ===
List of mayors of Indre
Term	Name	Party
	Mathurin Buet	
?- 1812 - ?	Pierre Fauluy	
1871	Victor Boquien	
1876–1907	Victor Boquien	
1907–1908	Jules Dupuy	
1908–?	Joseph Déjoie	
1921–?	Henri Michel	
1968–1977	Félix Guyot	SFIO
2001–2006	Alcide Maquaire	PS
2006–2014	Jean-Luc Le Drenn	DVG
2014–2020	Serge David	DVG
2020–incumbent	Anthony Berthelot	DVG

== Population ==
Historical population

Year	Pop.	±% p.a.
1793	1,360	—
1821	1,446	+0.22%
1846	3,483	+3.58%
1872	3,553	+0.08%
1901	3,792	+0.22%
1926	4,324	+0.53%
1946	4,477	+0.17%
1962	4,625	+0.20%
1968	4,286	−1.26%

Year	Pop.	±% p.a.
1975	3,709	−2.04%
1982	3,513	−0.77%
1990	3,262	−0.92%
1999	3,643	+1.23%
2007	3,761	+0.40%
2012	4,032	+1.40%
2017	3,969	−0.31%
2023	4,160	+0.79%

Source: EHESS and INSEE (1968-2023)

== Sights ==
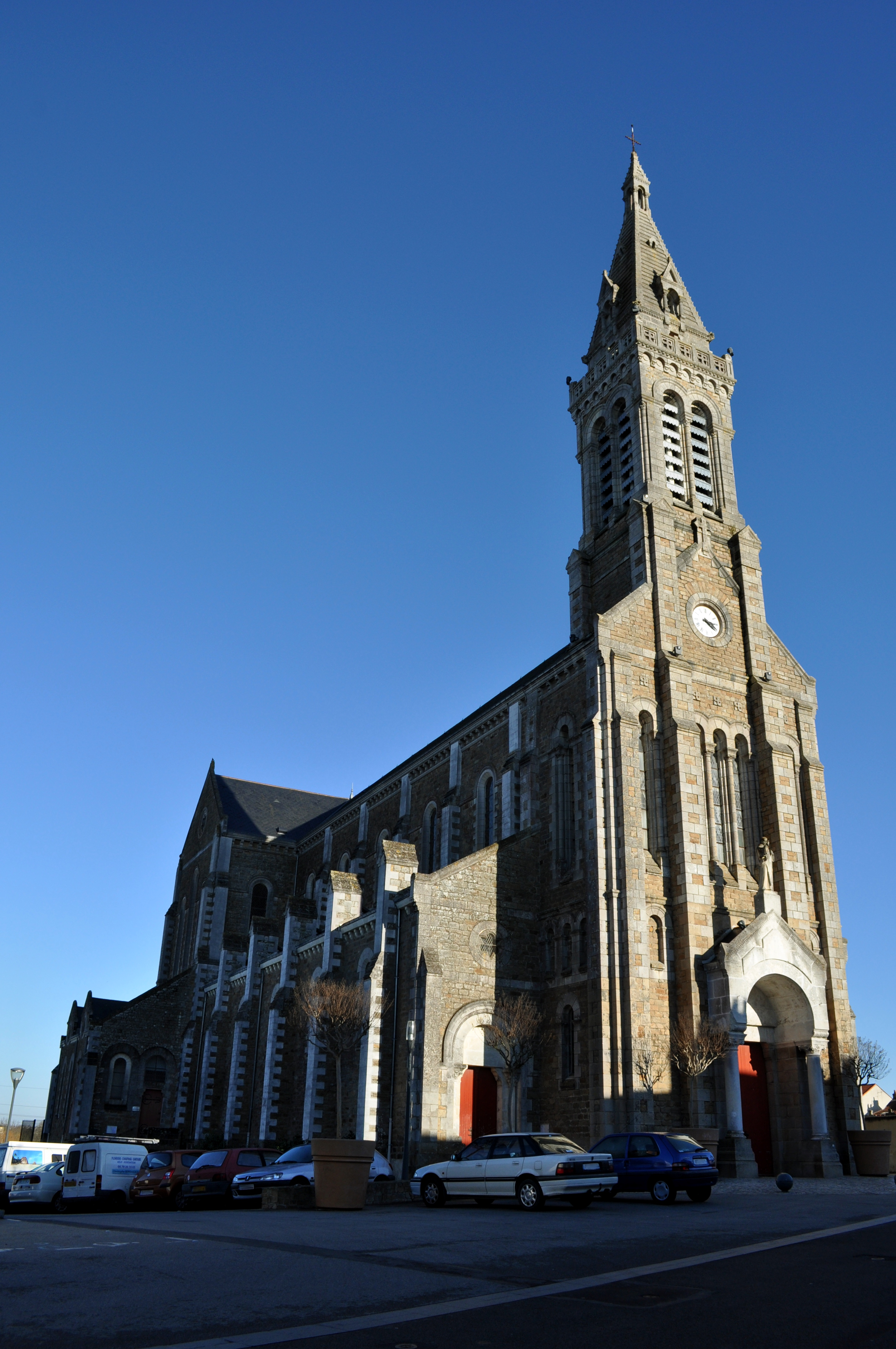

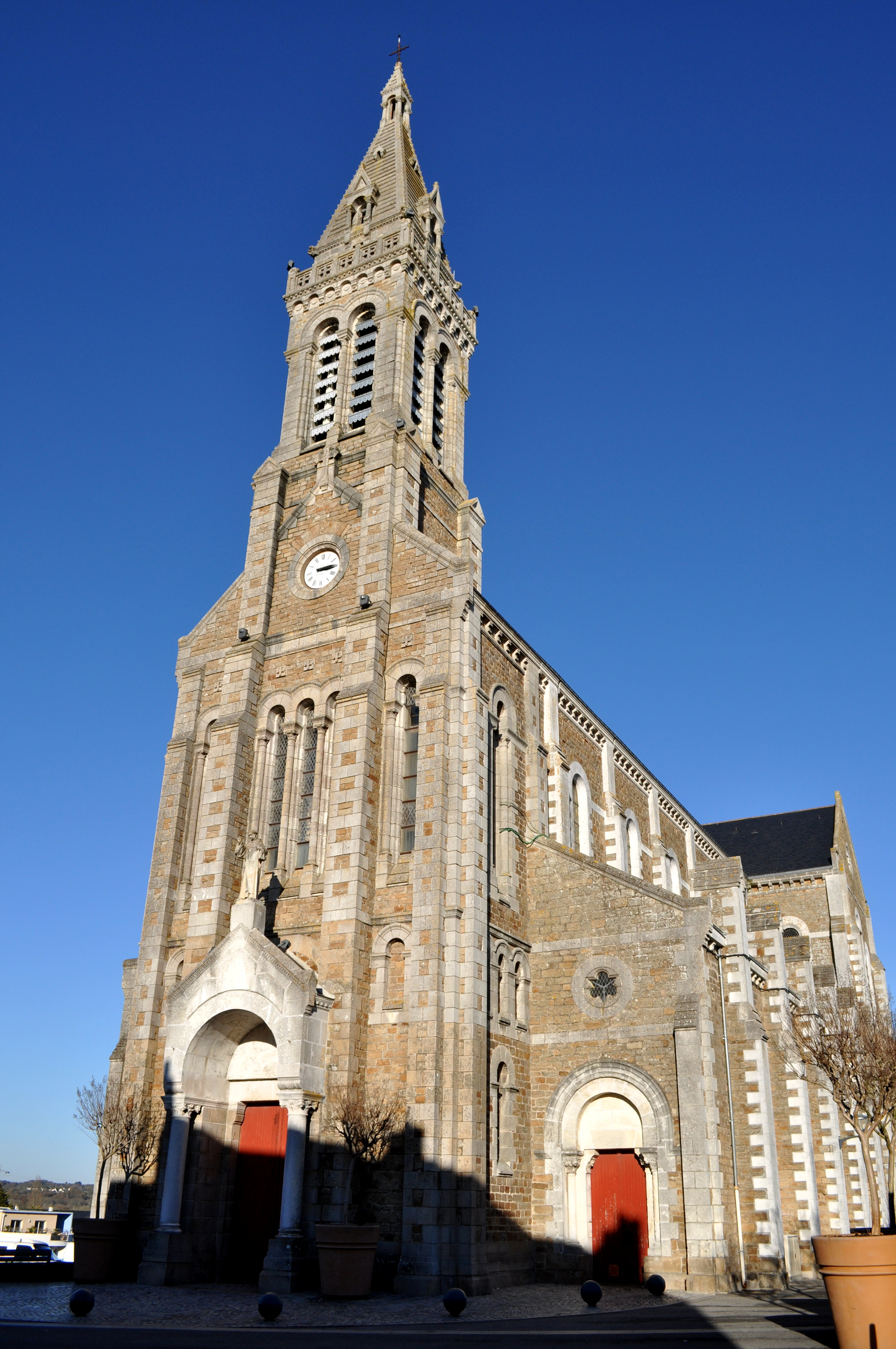

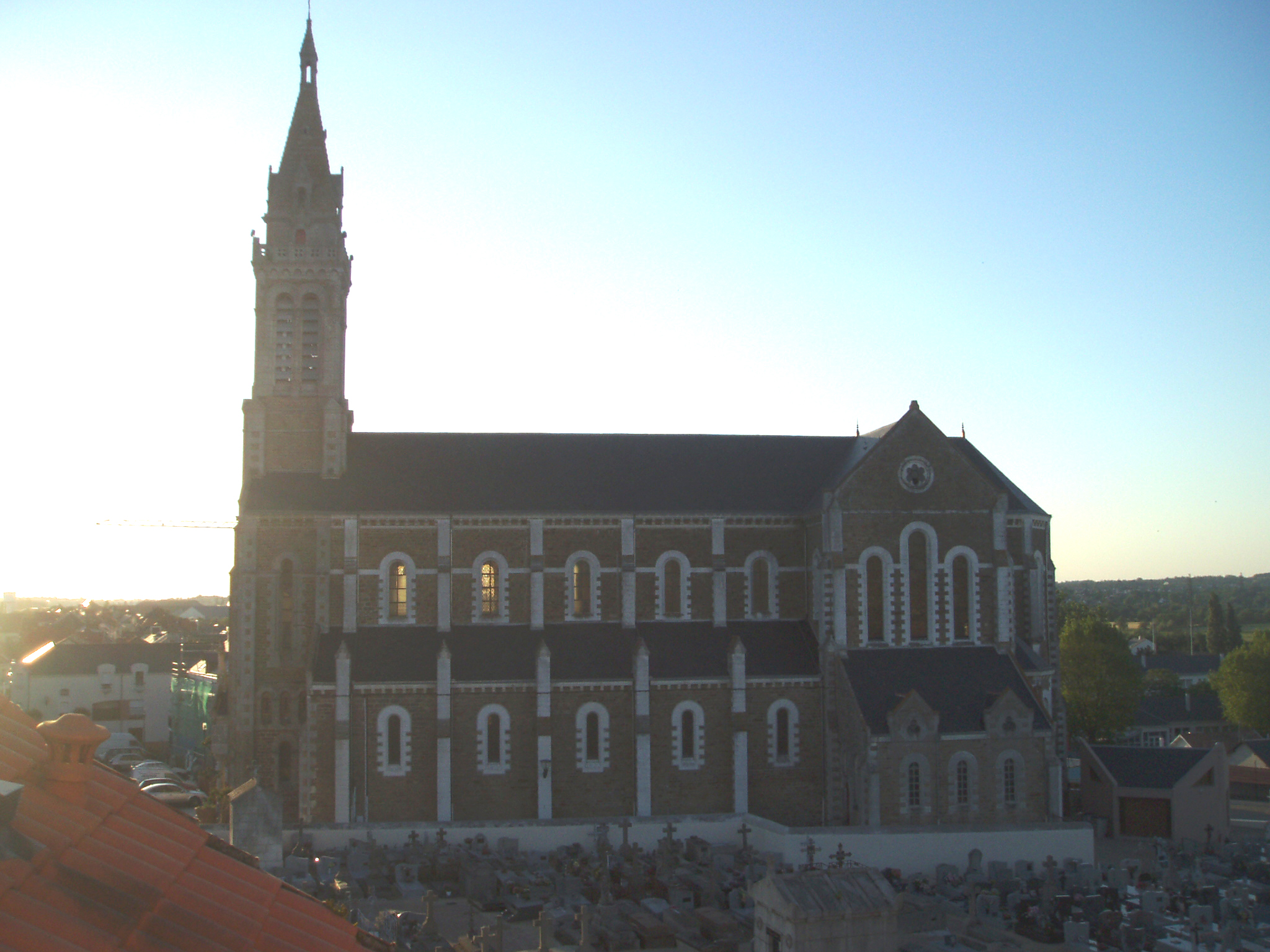

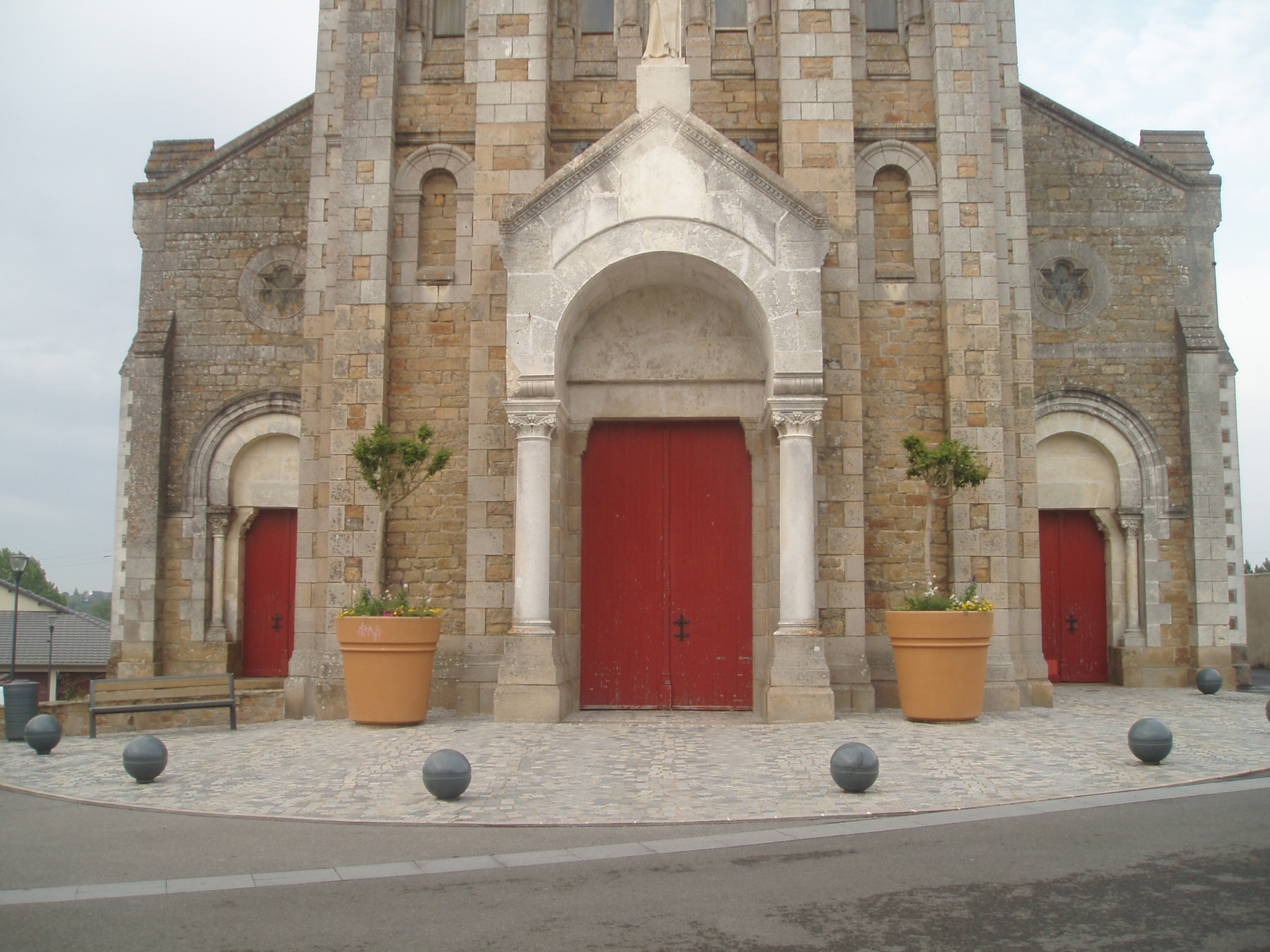

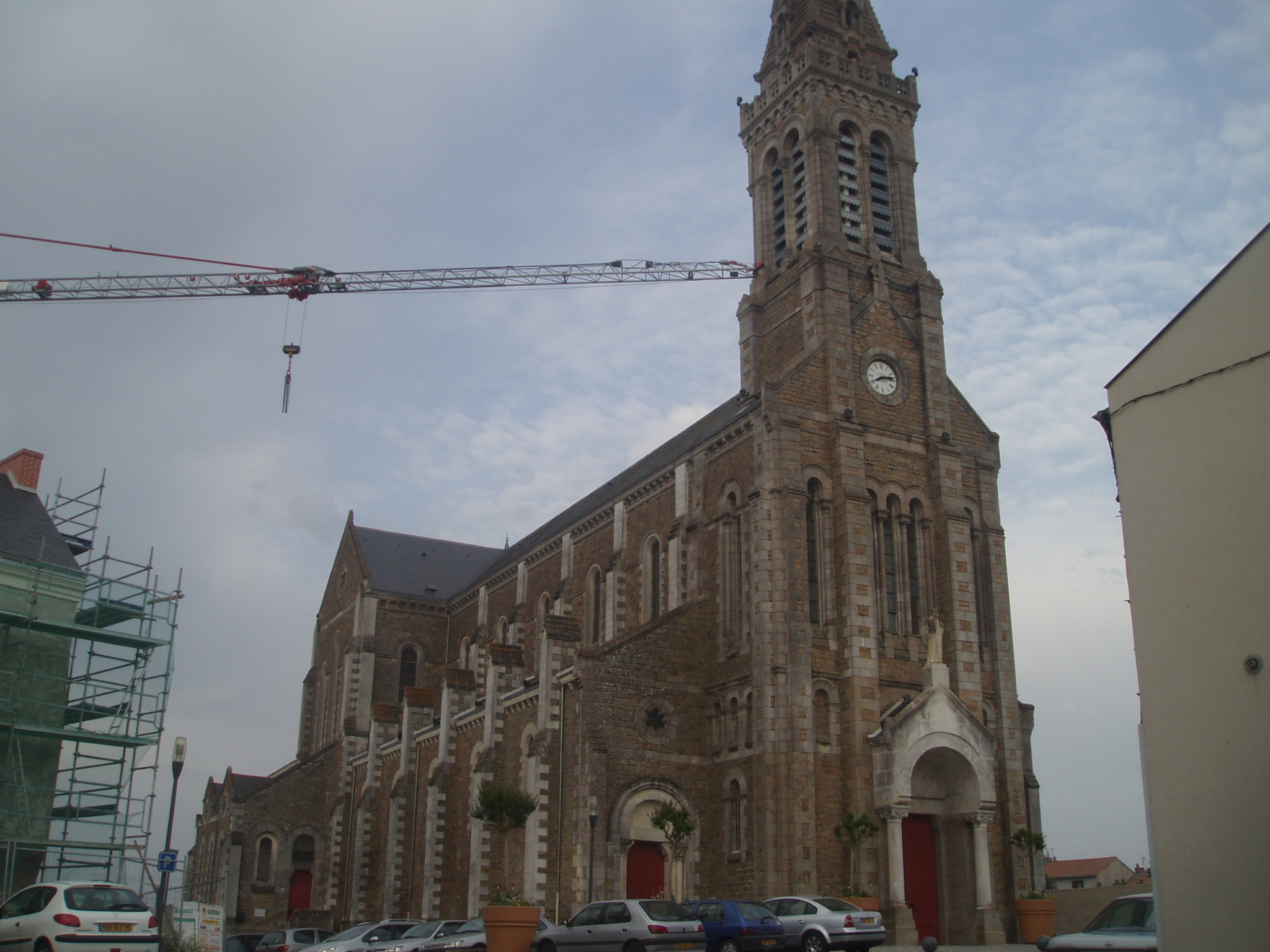

== See also ==
- Communes of the Loire-Atlantique department
