= List of European regions with alternative names =

Most regions and provinces of Europe have alternative names in different languages. Some regions have also undergone name changes for political or other reasons. This article attempts to give all known alternative names for all major European regions, provinces, and territories. It also includes some lesser regions that are important because of their location or history.

This article does not offer any opinion about what the "original", "official", "real", or "correct" name of any region is or was. Regions are (mostly) listed alphabetically by their current best-known name in English, which does not necessarily match the title of the corresponding article. The English version is followed by variants in other languages, in alphabetical order by name, and then by any historical variants and former names.

Foreign names that are the same as their English equivalents may be listed.

== A ==
English name	Other names or former names
Aargau or Argovia	Aargou or Aargau (Swiss German), Aargöi (archaic Swiss German), Argau - Аргау (Macedonian), Argau (Lithuanian), Ārgavas (Latvian), Argobia (Aragonese), Argovia (Aragonese, Asturian, Basque, Franco-Provençal, Galician, Interlingua, Italian, Latin, Lombard, Romanian, Romansh, Sicilian, Spanish, Venetian), Argòvia (Catalan, Occitan, Piedmontese), Argóvia (Portuguese), Argovie (French), Argovio (Esperanto), Argovja (Maltese), Argowia (Polish), Arqau (Azerbaijani)
Abruzzo	Abbrùzze, Abbrìzze or Abbrèzze (Neapolitan), Abbrùzzu (Sabino), Abbruzzu (Corsican, Sicilian), Abrózz (Emiliano-Romagnolo), Abruç (Friulian, Occitan), Abrucai (Lithuanian), Ābrucco - आब्रुच्चो (Marathi), Abrúcco - Абру́ццо (Russian, Ukrainian), Abruc'c'o - Աբրուցցո (Armenian), Abruco (Albanian, Esperanto, Latvian), Abruco - აბრუცო (Georgian), Abruco - Абруцо (Bulgarian, Macedonian), Abruço (Arpitan), Abruços (Catalan), Abruci (Slovenian), Abruso (Venetian), Abruss (Piedmontese), Abrusso (Ligurian), Abrútsi (Icelandic), Abrutstsi (Crimean Tatar), Abruttso (Azerbaijani), Abrutzu (Sardinian), Abruz (Breton), Abruzes (Franco-Provençal), Abruzja (Polish), Abruzo (Ladino), Abruzos (Aragonese, Galician, Portuguese, Spanish), Abruzze (Afrikaans, Limburgish), Abruzzen (Allemanic, Dutch, Frisian, German), Abruzzes (French), Abruzzi (historical English name), Abruzzi or Abruzzo (Italian, Lombard, Maltese, Romanian), Abruzzy (Slovak), Aburuttso shū - アブルッツォ州 (Japanese), Aprutium (Latin), Aprytion - Απρύτιον or Avrouzía - Αβρουζία (Greek)
Achaea or Achaia	Acaia (Catalan, Galician, Italian, Lombard, Portuguese), Acaya (Asturian, Spanish), Achaea or Achaia (Interlingua, Latin), Achaia, Achaje, Achaja or Achea (Dutch), Ac'haia (Breton), Achaia (Czech, German, Latin, Swedish), an Acháia (Irish), Achaïe (French), Achaja (Polish), Achája (Slovak), Ā-găi-ā (Mindong), Ahaia (Romanian), Ahaja (Croatian, Slovenian), Ahaja - Ахаја (Macedonian, Serbian), Ahaya (Turkish), Ahhaia (Estonian), Aĥeo (Esperanto), Akaia (Basque), Akaja (Albanian, Maltese), Akhaia (Finnish, Bokmål Norwegian, Malay, Winaray), Akhaía (Nynorsk Norwegian), Akhaïa - Αχαΐα (Greek), Akhaya (Indonesian), Ахайя (Russian), Ахая (Ukrainian), Axeya (Azerbaijani)
Aetolia	an Aetóil (Irish), Aetolië (Dutch), Aitōlía - Αιτωλία (Greek), Aitolia (Finnish, Indonesian, Norwegian), Aitólia (Slovak), Aitólie (Czech), Aitolio (Esperanto), Aitolien (Swedish), Aitoolia (Estonian), Ätolien (German), Etolia (Asturian, Basque, Italian, Polish, Spanish), Etólia (Portuguese), Etòlia (Catalan), Étolie (French), Etolija (Croatian, Lithuanian, Slovenian), Etolija - Етолија (Macedonian, Serbian), Etoliya (Azerbaijani), Etolja (Maltese), Etolya (Turkish), Етолия (Bulgarian), Этолия (Russian), أيتوليا (Arabic), Էտոլիա (Armenian)
Åland (Islands)	Aalandy (Slovak), Ahunamaa (Võro), Ahvenamaa (Estonian), Ahvenanma or Ahvenanman Sared (Veps), Ahvenanmaa (Finnish), Ålân(eilannen) (Western Frisian), Åland (Adaları) (Turkish), Åland (Gùng-dō̤) (Mindong), Åland (Khiùn-tó) (Hakka Chinese), Åland (Kûn-tó) (Minnan), Aland (adaları) (Azerbaijani), Aland (orollari) - Аланд (ороллари) (Uzbek), Åland (wat'akuna) (Quechua), Aland (Gagauz, Acehnese), Åland - Åланд or Olandski otoci - Оландски отоци (Serbo-Croatian), Åland(-eilanden) (Dutch, Zeelandic), Åland(-szigetek) (Hungarian), Åland(eilaanden) (Low Saxon), Åland(eilande) (Afrikaans), Åland(inselen) (Luxembourgish), Åland(inseln) (German), Áland(seyjar) (Icelandic), Åland(søerne) (Danish), Áland(soyggjar) (Faroese), Åland/Aland (uharteak) (Basque), Åland/Aaland (Occitan), Ålánda or Ålándda eanangoddi (Northern Sami), Alandai (Lithuanian), Alandia or Aboenses insulae (Latin), Ålandj(seilenj) (Limburgish), Alandské/Aalandské ostrovy (Slovak), Ålandski otoki (Slovenian), Ålandski/Olandski otoci (Croatian), Alandy (Czech, Slovak), Ålandy (Czech, Slovak), Ealendisca Iega or Ēalendiscan Īega (Old English), Oland (aelan) (Bislama), Oland - Оланд or Olandski ostrovi - Оландски острови (Macedonian), Olande or Ālandu salas (Latvian), Olandska Ostrva (Bosnian), Olandska Ostrva - Оландска Острва (Serbian), Wyspy Alandzkie (Polish), (Àwọn Erékùṣù) Åland (Yoruba), (Daèrah) Olan (Betawi), (Dunu) Aland (Wolof), (Eileanan) Åland (Scottish Gaelic), (Ellanyn) Åland (Manx), (Gżejjer) Aland (Maltese), (Ibirwa by’)Alande (Kinyarwanda), (Iles d')Åland (Arpitan), (Îles d')Åland/Aland/Aaland (French), (Ilhas) Åland/Aland/Alanda/Alândia (Portuguese), (Illes) Åland/Àland (Catalan), (Inizi/Enezeg) Åland (Breton), (Insulele) Åland (Romanian), (Insuloj) Alando (Esperanto, Ido), (Ishujt) Oland (Albanian), (Islanan) Åland (Papiamento), (Islas) Åland (Aragonese), (Islas) Åland/Aland/Aaland/Alandia (Spanish), (Isles) Åland (Novial), (Islles) Åland (Asturian), (Isoe) Åland (Ligurian), (Isol) Åland (Lombard), (Isole) Åland (Italian), (Isole/Ìsole) Åland (Venetian), (Ìsulas) Åland (Sardinian), (Kaiislahang) Åland (Central Bikol), (Kapuloan) Åland (Javanese, Sundanese), (Kapuluan ng) Åland or Alandiya (Tagalog), (Kapupud-ang) Aland (Cebuano), (Kapuropod-an) Åland (Waray), (Kepulauan) Åland (Indonesian, Malay), (Moutere) Ārana (Māori), (Nusar) Alándia (Tetum), (Oileáin) Åland (Irish), (Pae ʻāina ʻo) ʻŌlani (Hawaiian), (Quần đảo) Åland (Vietnamese), (Visiwa vya) Aland (Swahili), (Ynysoedd) Åland (Welsh), (Ynysow) Åland (Cornish), (giravên) Ålenda (Kurdish), (lllas) Åland (Galician), Ólant - Ώλαντ or Áalant - Άαλαντ (Greek), Ōrando-shotō - オーランド諸島 (Japanese), Alándskije ostrová - Ала́ндские острова́ or Alándy - Ала́нды (Russian), Oland - Оланд (Bulgarian), Alandi - ალანდი (Georgian)
Algarve	Algarvia (Latin), Algarve (French, Italian, Latvian, Maltese, Portuguese, Spanish, Turkish), Algarve - Алгарве (Macedonian), an Algarve (Irish), Algarvė (Lithuanian), الغرب (Arabic)
Allgäu	Algoj - Алгој (Macedonian), Algovia (Italian, Latin, Romanian, Spanish), Algòvia (Catalan), Algovja (Maltese) Allgäu (Dutch, French, German, Hungarian, Portuguese, Turkish)
Alsace	'Alzas - أَلْزْاَس (Arabic), Ā'ěrsàsī - 阿尔萨斯 (Mandarin), Aal-sás - อาลซัส (Thai), Aĕlses - अ‍ॅल्सेस or Āljhās - आल्झास (Marathi), Ailsais - ऐल्सैस (Hindi), Alisatia, Alsatia or Elisatia (Latin), Aljaseu - 알자스 (Korean), Alsace - Алсаце, Alzas - Алзас, Elzas - Елзас or Èlzas - Ѐлзас (Macedonian, Serbian), Alsace, Alsass or Elsass (Swedish), Alsace or Elsass (Danish, Estonian, Norwegian), Alsacia (Aragonese, Asturian, Galician, Romanian, Spanish), Alsácia (Portuguese), Alsàcia (Catalan, Occitan), Alsás (Welsh), Alsas or Alzas (Turkish), Alsasa, Alsasi or Alzasa (Albanian), Alsasia (Ladino), Alsàsia (Lombard), Alsasko (Czech, Slovak), Alsass (Cornish), Alsassia (Piedmontese), Alsatia (Interlingua), Alsatía - Αλσατία (Greek), Alsàtzia (Sardinian), Alsazia (Basque, Corsican, Italian, Venetian), Alsazie (Friulian), Alsazja (Maltese), Alsazzia (Sicilian), Alzace (Arpitan), Alzacia (Ido), Alzacija (Slovenian), Alzacja (Polish), Alzaco (Esperanto), Alzacyjo (Silesian), Alzas (Antillean Creole, Haitian Creole), Alzas - ალზას, Elzas - ელზას or Elzasi - ელზასი (Georgian), Alzas - אלזס or Alzás - לורן (Hebrew), Alzasi - ალზასი (Abkhaz), An Alsáis (Irish), Arusasu - アルザス or Aruzasu - アルザス (Japanese), Ejsass, Elsass or Öisass (Bavarian), Elʹzas - Ельзас or Elʹzás - Ельза́с (Ukrainian), Elʹzas - Эльзас (Belarusian), Elʹzás - Эльза́с (Russian), Elsas (Afrikaans, Kurdish), Elsas or Elzas (Azerbaijani), Elsaska (Lower Sorbian, Upper Sorbian), Elsass (Finnish, German, Luxembourgish, Old English, Palatine German, Pennsylvania German), Elsaß (German before 1996), Elsàss (Alemannic), Elsàss or Elses (Alsatian), Elzas (Breton, Croatian, Dutch, Kashubian, Limburgish, Talysh, Western Frisian, Zazaki), Elzas - Елзас or Elzás - Eлза́с (Bulgarian), Ēlzas - Էլզաս (Armenian), Elzas - עלזאַס (Yiddish), Elzas - آلزاس (Persian), Elzasa (Latvian), Elzasas (Lithuanian), Elzász (Hungarian)
Andalusia	Andalousia (Arpitan), Andalousie (French), Andalucía (Spanish), an Andalúis (Irish), Andalusia (Catalan, Finnish, Italian, Lombard, variant in Romanian), Andalusija (Maltese), Andaloezië or Andalusië (Dutch), Al-Andalus - الأندلس (Arabic, meaning the whole Spain), Andalusie (Czech), Andalusien (Danish, German, Swedish), Andaluusia (Estonian), Andaluzia (Albanian, Portuguese, Romanian), Andalúzia (Hungarian), Andaluzie (Czech), Andalūzija (Latvian, Lithuanian), Andaluzija (Slovene), Andaluzija - Андалузија (Macedonian, Serbian), Andaluzja (Polish), Endülüs (Turkish), Vandalitia (Latin), Vandalysia - Βανδαλυσία (Greek)
Ångermanland	Angermània (Catalan), Angermânia (Portuguese), Ångermanland (Estonian, Swedish, Turkish), Angermannia (Latin), Ongermanland - Онгерманланд or Angermanija - Ангерманија (Macedonian)
Angria or Angaria	Angria (Turkish), Angrie (French), Angrija - Ангрија (Macedonian), Engern (German), Aggria - Αγγρία (Greek)
Anhalt	Anhalt (Catalan, Croatian, Danish, Dutch, Estonian, French, Frisian, German, Hungarian, Italian, Lombard, Low Saxon, Maltese, Norwegian, Polish, Portuguese, Romanian, Slovene, Spanish, Swedish, Turkish), Anhalt - Анхалт (Macedonian), Anhaltas (Lithuanian), Anhaltinum (Latin), Anhaltsko (Czech), Anholt (Afrikaans)
Anjou	Andegavensis or Andegavia (Latin), Andegawenia (Polish), Anjou (Catalan, Dutch, Estonian, French, German, Hungarian, Portuguese, Romanian, Turkish), Angiò (Italian), Anġò (Maltese), Anžu - Анжу (Macedonian), Anžuj (Serbian), Anjeo (Spanish)
Appenzell	Apencel - Апенцел (Macedonian), Apentsèl (Arpitan), Àpenzel (Catalan), Appenzell (Dutch, Estonian, Finnish, French, German, Hungarian, Maltese, Portuguese, Romanian, Turkish), Appenzello (Italian)
Apulia	'Äpuliya - አፑሊያ (Amharic), Apoulía - Απουλία (Greek), Apuli (Cornish), Apuli - Апули (Chechen, Ossetian), Ap̬uli - Апули (Chuvash), Apúlia (Portuguese, Slovak), Apúlía (Icelandic), Apuliä - Апулия (Kazakh), Aṗulia - აპულია (Georgian), Apulia - Ապուլիա (Armenian), Apulia or Puglia (Ido, Kurdish), Apulia or Pulla (Spanish), Apulie (Czech, Scots), Apulië (Afrikaans, Dutch, Limburgish, West Flemish), Apulie or Apulien (Alemannic), Apulie, Pouille or Pouilles (French), Apulien (Danish, German, Swedish), Apulija (Bosnian, Croatian, Lithuanian), Apūlija (Latvian), Apulija - Апулија (Macedonian), Apulija - Апулија or Àpūlija - А̀пӯлија (Serbian), Apúlija - Апу́лия (Russian), Apulija - Апулія (Belarusian, Ukrainian), Apulija or Apúlija (Slovenian), Apulio or Apulujo (Esperanto), Apuliya (Azerbaijani, Crimean Tatar), Āpūliyā - आपूलिया (Marathi), Apûlje (Western Frisian), Apullia - 아풀리아 (Korean), Apulya (Tagalog, Zazaki), Apuulia (Estonian), Apuulien (Northern Frisian), Pógglia (Emiliano-Romagnolo), Polha (Occitan), Poulles (Picard), Poulye (Arpitan), Pouyes (Walloon), Ppùglia or Pùglia (Neapolitan), Pugghia (Sicilian), Pugghie (Tarantino), Puggia or Pûggia (Ligurian), Puglia (Asturian, Balinese, Breton, Corsican, Galician, Hakka Chinese, Hungarian, Indonesian, Irish, Italian, Javanese, Kikuyu, Ladin, Ladino, Minnan, Northern Sami, Norwegian, Scottish Gaelic, Swahili, Vietnamese, Welsh), Pùglia (Sardinian), Puia (Salentino), Puia or Puja (Venetian), Puilla (Old English), Puja or Püja (Lombard), Púl or Púll (Old Norse), Pulia (Albanian, Piedmontese), Pulia - פוליה (Hebrew), Pūlīā - ਪੂਲੀਆ (Punjabi), Pulie (Friulian), Púlija - Пу́лия (Bulgarian), Puliyâ - پولیا (Persian), Puliyā - पुलिया (Hindi), Pǔlìyà - 普利亚 (Traditional Mandarin), Pǔlìyā - 普利亞 (Simplified Mandarin), Pulja (Maltese), Pulla (Aragonese, Catalan, Old Galician-Portuguese), Pulya (Turkish), Pūria - プーリア, Purrya - プッリャ, Purrya shū - プッリャしゅう or Pūrya - プーリャ (Japanese)
Aquitaine	Acuitania (Venetian), Aguiéne (Poitevin-Saintongeais), Akitania (Basque, Breton, Ladino), Akitanya (Turkish, Zazaki), Akîtanya (Kurdish), Akouitania - Ακουιτανία (Greek), Akuitania (Albanian), Akvitaania (Estonian), Akvitania (Finnish, Northern Sami), Akvitanía (Icelandic), Akvitánie (Czech), Akvitanien (Swedish), Akvitanija (Bosnian, Croatian, Lithuanian, Slovenian), Akvitanija - Аквитанија (Serbian), Akvitānija (Latvian), Akvitanio (Esperanto), Akvitaniya (Azerbaijani), Akvitaniya - Аквитания (Uzbek), Akvitánsko or Akvitánia (Slovak), Akwitaanje (Western Frisian), Akwitania (Polish), Akwitanië (Afrikaans), Akwitanja (Maltese), An Acatáin (Irish), Aquitania (Aragonese, Arpitan, Asturian, Galician, Ido, Italian, Latin, Lombard, Nahuatl, Piedmontese, Romanian, Sicilian, Spanish, Tagalog), Aquitania, Aquitánia or Akvitánia (Hungarian), Aquitània (Catalan, Occitan), Aquitánia (Extremaduran), Aquitânia (Portuguese), Aquitanie (Alemannic), Aquitanië (Dutch), Aquitanien (Danish, German), Guiana (archaic Occitan), Guyenne or Guienne (archaic English, archaic French), Ghienna (archaic Italian), Guiena (archaic Portuguese), Gujenna (archaic Polish), Gujeno (archaic Esperanto), Guyena (archaic Spanish)
Aragon	Ālāgòng - 阿拉貢 (Mandarin), An Aragóin (Irish), Aragão (Portuguese), Aragaun (Tetum), Aragó (Catalan), Aragõ (Guarani), Arago or Aragon (Occitan), Aragoi (Basque), Aragón (Aragonese, Asturian, Estonian, Extremaduran, Galician, Limburgish, Manx, Minnan, Norwegian, Novial, Scottish Gaelic, Spanish, Tagalog, Vietnamese, Waray, Welsh, West Flemish), Aragon - Арагон (Macedonian, Serbian, Uzbek), Aragón - Араго́н (Bulgarian, Russian), Aragon - Արագոն (Armenian), Ārāgon - आरागोन (Marathi), Aragon - アラゴン (Japanese), Aragon, Aragón, Arragon or Arragonië (Dutch), Aragon or Aragona (Turkish), Aragón or Aragonija (Bosnian), Aragon-a (Piedmontese), Aragona (Albanian, Latvian, Lombard, Maltese, Sardinian, Venetian), Aragona or Ragona (Italian), Aragonas (Lithuanian), Aragonia (Finnish, Latin, Polish), Aragónia (Hungarian), Aragonía - Αραγονία (Greek), Aragonie (Czech), Aragonien (Alemannic, Danish, German, Luxembourgish, Saterland Frisian, Swedish), Aragonija (Croatian, Slovenian), Aragoniô (Kashubian), Aragono (Esperanto), Aragónsko (Slovak), Aragoonien (Northern Frisian), Aragounii (Livvi-Karelian), Aragun (Arabic), Arakona (Māori), Araqon (Azerbaijani), Araqun (Quechua), Araùna or Raguna (Sicilian)
Arcadia	Arcadia (Interlingua, Italian, Latin, Lombard, Romanian, Spanish, Vietnamese, Welsh), Arcádia (Portuguese), Arcàdia (Catalan), Arcadie (French), an Arcáid (Irish), Arkaadia (Estonian), Arkadia (Basque, Breton, Finnish, Indonesian, Slovak), Arkadía - Αρκαδία (Greek), Arkádie (Czech), Arkadien (Danish, German, Luxembourgish, Swedish), Arkadija (Croatian, Lithuanian), Arkadija - Аркадија (Macedonian), Arkadio (Esperanto), Arkadja (Maltese), Arkadya (Turkish), Аркадия (Russian), Аркадія (Ukrainian), Արկադիա (Armenian)
Ardennes	Ardena (Occitan), Ardėnai (Lithuanian), Ardenas (Portuguese, Spanish), Ardenak (Basque), Årdene (Walloon), Ardène (Picard), Ardenes (Catalan), Ardeni (Croatian, Romanian, Slovenian), Ardeni - Ардени (Macedonian, Serbian), Ardēni (Latvian), Ardenler (Turkish), Ardenlər (Azerbaijani), Ardenn (West Flemish), Ardennafjöll (Icelandic), Ardennane (Norwegian Nynorsk), Ardenne (Afrikaans, Breton, Colognian, Italian, Limburgish), Ardenne or Ardennes (French), Ardennek (Hungarian), Ardennen (Dutch, German, Luxembourgish, Saterland Frisian), Ardennene (Norwegian Bokmål), Ardennerna (Swedish), Ardennerne (Danish), Ardennid (Estonian), Ardennit (Finnish), Ardenoj (Esperanto), Ardeny (Czech, Polish, Slovak), Ardinnen (Western Frisian), Arduenna, Ardenna or Arduendunum (Latin), Na hArdennes (Irish)
Artois	Artesië (Dutch), Artois (French, Italian, Romanian, Turkish) Artois or Artésia (Portuguese), Artua - Артуа or Artoa - Артоа (Macedonian), Atrebatensis (Latin)
Asturias	an Astúir (Irish), Astuerje (Western Frisian), Asturi (Sicilian), Asturia (Albanian, Finnish, Ido, Indonesian, Interlingue, Northern Sami, Polish, Romanian), Astúria (Slovak), Astúría (Icelandic), Asturiae (Latin), Astúrias (Occitan, Portuguese), Astùrias (Sardinian), Asturie (Czech, Italian, Lombard, Piedmontese), Asturië (Afrikaans, Dutch, Limburgish), Astùrie (Venetian), Asturien (Danish, German, Luxemburgish, Swedish), Asturies (Arpitan, Asturian, French, Haitian Creole, Ladin), Astúries (Catalan), Asturiez (Breton), Asturii (variant in Romanian), Asturija (Bosnian, Croatian, Slovenian), Astūrija (Latvian, Lithuanian), Asturija - Астурија (Macedonian, Serbian), Asturio (Esperanto), Asturiya (Azerbaijani, Crimean Tatar), Asturiya - Астурия (Uzbek), Asturja (Maltese), Astuuria (Estonian), Astuurien (Northern Frisian), Asturya (Cornish), Asturyas (Zazaki), Astyria - Αστυρία (Greek), Asztúria (Hungarian), Stúrias (Mirandese)
Attica	an Ataic (Irish), Àtica (Catalan), Ática (Portuguese, Spanish), Atika (Albanian, Estonian, Latvian, Slovene), Atika - Атика (Macedonian), Attica (Dutch, Italian, Latin, Romanian), Attika (Czech, Danish, Dutch alternate, Finnish, German, Hungarian, Maltese, Swedish, Turkish), Attikí - Αττική (Greek), Attique (French), Attyka (Polish)
Auvergne	Alvérni - Αλβέρνη (Greek), Alvèrnia or Auvernya (Catalan), Alvernia (Italian, Piedmontese), Alvernja (Maltese), Arvernia (Latin), Ârvèrgne (Arpitan), Auvergne - Аувергне (Serbian), Aŭvernjo (Esperanto), Auvèrnha, Auvèrhne or Euvarnhà (Occitan), Auvernia (Galician, Spanish), Auvérnia (Portuguese), Overnj - Оверњ (Macedonian), Owernia (Polish)

== B ==
English name	Other names or former names
Bačka	Bacica or Bácska (Romanian), Backa or Bačka (Dutch, Estonian, French, Galician, Indonesian, Italian, Latvian, Lithuanian, Norwegian, Spanish, Swedish), Baçka (Albanian, Azerbaijani, Turkish), Baĉka (Esperanto), Bačka - Бачка (Macedonian, Serbian), Báčka (Slovak), Bácska (Hungarian), Baczka (Polish), Bakka (Maltese), Batschka (German)
Baden	Badän (Volapük), Bade (French), Bade or Baden (Portuguese), baden (Lojban), Baden - Баден (Bulgarian, Macedonian, Russian, Serbian, Uzbek), Badenas (Lithuanian), Bādene (Latvian), Badenia (Ido, Latin, Polish), Badeno (Esperanto), Badensko (Lower Sorbian, Upper Sorbian), Bádensko (Czech, Slovak), Boadn (Low Saxon), Bodn (Bavarian), Vádhi - Βάδη (Greek)
Baden-Württemberg, Baden-Wurttemberg or Baden-Wurtemberg	Badän⸗Vürtän (Volapük), Bade-Wöötebersch (Colognian), Bade-Wurtemberg (French), badenvirtemberg (Lojban), Baden-Virtemberg - Баден-Виртемберг (Macedonian, Serbian), Baden-Virtembergo (Esperanto), Baden-Vurtemberg (Tolysh), Baden-Vürtemberq (Azerbaijani, Crimean Tatar), Baden-Vyrtemberg (Albanian), Baden-Vyurtemberg (Kara-Kalpak), Baden-Vyurtemberg - Баден-Вюртемберг (Russian, Uzbek), Baden-Wuertemberch (Western Frisian), Baden-Wurtemberg (Aragonese, Catalan, Guarani, Spanish, Tagalog), Baden-Würtemberg (Basque), Baden-Wurtemberga (Kashubian), Baden-Wurtembierich (Saterland Frisian), Baden-Wurttemberg (Kurdish, Romanian), Baden-Württemberg (Afrikaans, Alemannic, Asturian, Aymara, Balinese, Bosnian, Breton, Catalan, Cebuano, Cornish, Corsican, Croatian, Danish, Dagbani, Dutch, Emiliano-Romagnolo, Estonian, Faroese, Finnish, Friulian, Galician, German, Hungarian, Icelandic, Iloko, Javanese, Indonesian, Interlingua, Interlingue, Irish, Italian, Kongo, Ladin, Ladino, Ligurian, Limburgish, Lombard, Low German, Luxembourgish, Manx, Malagasy, Malay, Northern Sami, Northern Frisian, Norwegian, Occitan, Palatine German, Pampanga, Papiamento, Piedmontese, Romanian, Romansh, Quechua, Sardinian, Scots, Scottish Gaelic, Sicilian, Slovenian, Sranan Tongo, Sraran Tongo, Swahili, Swedish, Turkish, Turkmen, Venetian, Vietnamese, Waray, Welsh, West Flemish, Yoruba, Zazaki, Zeelandic), Baden-Ƿyrttemberg (Old English), Badenas-Viurtembergas (Lithuanian), Bādene-Virtemberga (Latvian), Badenia et Virtembergia (Latin), Badenia-Wirtembergia (Polish), Badenia-Wurtemberg (Ido), Bádensko-Würt(t)embersko (Czech, Slovak), Badensko-Württembergska (Lower Sorbian, Upper Sorbian), Bade-Vurtemberga, Baden-Wuerttemberg or Baden-Württemberg (Portuguese), Boadn-Wurttembaarg (Low Saxon), Bodn-Wiattmbeag (Bavarian), Vádhi-Vytemvérghi - Βάδη-Βυτεμβέργη (Greek)
Banat	Baanaatti (Finnish), Banaat (Dutch, Estonian, Limburgish), Banat - Банат (Bulgarian, Macedonian, Serbian), Banát (Czech, Slovak), Ba̱nat (Tyap), Banata (Latvian), Banatas (Lithuanian), Banatet (Danish, Swedish), Banati (Albanian), Banato (Aragonese, Esperanto, Galician, Italian, Portuguese), Banato, Bánato or Banat (Spanish), Banatus (Latin), Bánság or Bánát (Hungarian), Vanáton - Βανάτον (Greek)
Baranya	Baranya (Estonian, Hungarian, Turkish), Barãnia (Portuguese), Baranja (Croatian, Maltese, Slovene), Baranja - Барања (Macedonian, Serbian), Baraņa (Latvian), Varonia - Βαρωνεια (Greek)
Basilicata	Basilicata (Catalan, Dutch, Estonian, Hungarian, Italian, Polish, Portuguese, Romanian, Spanish, Finnish, Turkish), Basilicata or Basilikata (German), Basilicate (French), Bazilikata (Albanian, Latvian), Bazilikata - Базиликата (Macedonian), Bażilikata (Maltese), Lucania (former Italian, Latin), Lucània (former Catalan), Lucanie (former French), Lukania (former Polish), Lukanien (former German), Vasilikáta-Lefkanía - Βασιλικατα-Λευκανία (Greek)
Basque Country	A̱byin A̱basi̱ko, A̱byin A̱wusi̱ka̱ra or A̱wusi̱ka̱la̱riya (Tyap), An Tìr Basgach or Dùthaich nam Basgach (Scots Gaelic), auskalerik (Lojban), Bascheascã, Limba vascã or Vascã (Aromanian), Baschia or Paes Basch (Lombard), Bascoat, País Basc or País Basco (Occitan), Bascònia, Euskadi or País Basc (Catalan), Bask or Bask Ülkesi (Turkish), Bask torpaqları (Azerbaijani), Baska lando, Eŭskio, Eŭsklando or Eŭskujo (Esperanto), Baskaland (Icelandic), Baskaralandið (Faroese), Baskarland (Norwegian Nynorsk), Baskeland (Afrikaans, Limburgish), Baskenland (Dutch, German, Low German), Baskenlun (Northern Frisian), Baskerland (Norwegian Bokmål), Baskerlandet (Danish), Baskia (Albanian), Baskicko (Czech), Baskien (Swedish), Baskija (Bosnian, Croatian, Lithuanian), Baskija - Баскија (Macedonian, Serbian), Baskija or Baskovske dežele (Slovenian), Baskimaa (Estonian, Finnish, Võro), Baskimua (Livvi-Karelian), Baskistan or Welatê Baskî (Kurdish), Basknland (West Flemish), Baskonia or Kraj Basków (Polish), Basku zeme (Latvian), Basque Kintra (Scots), Basque tē-hng (Minnan), Basukukoku - バスク国 (Japanese), Baszkföld (Hungarian), Bro-Vask or Euskal Herria (Breton), Euscaleria (Lingua Franca Nova), Euscalreye (Walloon), Euskadi (Bân-Lâm), Euskadi or Euskal Herria (Basque, Venetian), Euskadi, Euskal Herria, Paisi Baschi or Paisi Bascu (Sicilian), Euskadi or Poéyis basque (Picard), Euskal Herria (Extremaduran, Ido), Euskal Herria or País Basco (Aragonese), Euskal Herria, País Vascu or Vasconia (Asturian), Firenena Baska (Malagasy), Guascogna or Paese basco (Italian), Gwlad y Basg (Welsh), il-Pajjiżi Baski (Maltese), Nchi ya Kieuskara (Swahili), Negara Basque (Indonesian), Paíç Basco (Mirandese), País Basco (Portuguese), País Vasco (Galician), País Vasco, Vascongadas or Vasconia (Spanish), Paisu Bascu (Sardinian), Payis bâsco (Arpitan), Pays basque (French), Pow Bask (Cornish), Tamurt n Ibaskiyen (Kabyle), Țara Bascilor (Romanian), Te Whenua Pākihi (Māori), Tír na mBascach (Irish), Vasconia (Latin), Vaskonía - Βασκονία (Greek), Xứ Basque (Vietnamese), (Y(n)) Çheer ny Bascee or (Y(n)) Çheer Vascagh (Manx)
Bavaria	A' Bhaidhearn (Scottish Gaelic), An Bhaváir (Irish), Bægƿaraland (Old English), Bæjaraland (Icelandic), Bafaria (Welsh), Baieri (Estonian), Baiern (Lingua Franca Nova), Baiern or Baijern (German until 1825), Baiern or Bayern (Low Saxon), Baijeri (Finnish), Baioaria (Medieval Latin), Bajerë (Kashubian), Bajern or Bavaria (Albanian), Bajery (Silesian), Bajore (Colognian), Bajorország (Hungarian), Bavaari (Pennsylvania German), Bavāreja (Latgalian), Bavarėjė (Samogitian), Bavaria (Basque, Breton, Cebuano, Cornish, Dagbani, English, Ido, Iloko, Interlingua, Interlingue, Komering, Kongo, Latin, Malagasy, Malay, Novial, Pampanga, Romanian, Swahili, Yoruba), Bavária or Baviera (Portuguese), Bavarie (Scots), Bavarija (Lithuanian, Talysh), Bavārija (Latvian), Bavarija - Баварија (Macedonian), Bavario or Bavarujo (Esperanto), Bavariya (Azerbaijani, Crimean Tatar, Kara-Kalpak), Bavariya - Бавария (Bulgarian, Russian, Uzbek), Bavariya - Баварія (Ukrainian), Bavarja (Maltese), Bavarska (Bosnian, Croatian, Slovenian), Bavarska - Баварска (Serbian), Bavea (Ligurian), Bavera (Aragonese), Bavéra (Emiliano-Romagnolo), Baviera (Asturian, Catalan, Chavacano, Extremaduran, Galician, Italian, Lombard, Piedmontese, Romansh, Sardinian, Sicilian, Spanish, Tagalog, Tetum, Venetian), Bavièra (Occitan), Baviere (Friulian), Baviére (Arpitan), Bavière (French, Picard), Bavire (Walloon), Bavorsko (Czech, Slovak), Bavyera (Kurdish, Turkish, Zazaki), Bawaria (Polish), Bawariýa (Turkmen), Bawarya or Bayern (Quechua), Bawaryah - בוואריה (Hebrew), Bayän (Vopapük), Bayern (Aymara, Balinese, Danish, German, Indonesian, Javanese, Low German, Luxembourgish, Mindong, Minnan, Northern Frisian, Northern Sami, Norwegian, Palatine German, Papiamento, Saterland Frisian, Sundanese, Swedish, Vietnamese, Waray, Zeelandic), Bayern or Bayre (Alemannic), Bayern or Boarn (Bavarian), Bayerska (Lower Sorbian, Upper Sorbian), Beiere (Afrikaans, Limburgish), Beieren (Dutch, Western Frisian), Beyern (West Flemish), Paiern (Ladin), Vavaría - Βαυαρία (Greek), Vaviéra (Guarani), Yn Vaveyr (Manx)
Bessarabia	An Bhasaráib (Irish), Basarabia (Romanian), Besarabia (Albanian, Basque, Breton, Galician, Ido, Malagasy, Polish, Spanish), Besarábia (Slovak), Besarábie (Czech), Besarabija (Croatian, Lithuanian, Slovenian), Besarābija (Latvian), Besarabija - Бесарабија (Macedonian, Serbian), Besarabio (Esperanto), Besarabiô (Kashubian), Besarabiya (Gagauz), Besarabiya - Бесарабия (Bulgarian), Besarabska (Lower Sorbian), Besarabya (Turkish, Zazaki), Bessaraabia (Estonian), Bessarabeye (Walloon), Bessarabia (English, Finnish, Indonesian, Italian, Latin, Malay, Norwegian, Vietnamese), Bessarabía (Icelandic), Bessarábia (Portuguese), Bessaràbia (Catalan, Occitan), Bessarabie (French, Low Saxon), Bessarabië (Dutch), Bessarabien (Danish, German, Swedish), Bessarabiya (Azerbaijani), Bessarabiya - Бессарабия (Russian, Uzbek), Bessarabiya - Бессарабія (Ukrainian), Bessarabja (Maltese), Bessarabska (Upper Sorbian), Besszarábia (Hungarian), Vessaravía - Βεσσαραβία (Greek)
Bihor	Bihar (Hungarian, Turkish alternate, German), Bihor (Estonian, Romanian, Turkish), Bihor - Бихор (Macedonian)
Blekinge	Blechingia (Latin), Blecíngia (Portuguese), Blekinge (Danish, Estonian, Hungarian, Latvian, Swedish, Turkish), Blekinge - Блекинге (Macedonian)
Boeotia	Beocia (Spanish), Beòcia (Catalan), Beócia, (variant in Hungarian, Portuguese), Beocja (Polish), Beotië (variant in Dutch), Beoția (Romanian), Béotie (French), Beotien (variant in Swedish), Beotija - Беотија (Macedonian), Beozia (Italian), Beozja (Maltese), Boeotia (Latin), Boeotië (Dutch), Bojotija (Latvian, Lithuanian), Boiootia (Estonian), Boiotia (Finnish), Boiótia (Hungarian), Boiotien (Swedish), Bøotien (Danish), Böotien (German), Böotya (Turkish), an Bhéóitia (Irish), Viotía - Βοιωτία (Greek)
Bohemia	An Bhoihéim (Irish), Bæheimur (Icelandic), Bæmaland (Old English), Behmen (Bavarian), Boemia (Italian, Lombard, Romanian), Boémia (Portuguese), Boèmia (Occitan), Boêmia (Brazilian Portuguese), Boemja (Maltese), Bogemija - Богемия or Čehija - Чехия (Russian), Bogemiya - Богемия (Uzbek), Boheemn (West Flemish), Boheme (Afrikaans), Bohème (Picard), Bohême (French), Bohemen (Dutch, Low Saxon, Western Frisian), Bohèmen (Javanese), Bohemia (Albanian, Aragonese, Asturian, Basque, Breton, English, Galician, Ido, Indonesian, Interlingua, Interlingue, Malay, Minnan, Scottish Gaelic, Spanish, Swahili, Waray, Welsh, Yoruba), Bohèmia (Catalan), Bohemia or Boiohaemum (Latin), Bohemia or Čechy (Vietnamese), Bohémia, Cseh föld or Csehország (Hungarian), Bohemija (Lithuanian), Bohēmija (Latvian), Bohemija - Бохемија, Bohemska - Бохемска, Bohemska Češka - Бохемска Чешка or Češka - Чешка (Serbian), Bohemija - Бохемија or Češka - Чешка (Macedonian), Bohemio or Bohemujo (Esperanto), Bohemiya (Azerbaijani), Bohemya (Kurdish, Quechua, Tagalog, Turkish), Böhmen (Alemannic, German, Low German, Swedish), Bøhmen (Danish), Böhmen, Bøhmen or Čechy (Norwegian), Böömi (Finnish), Böömimaa or Čechy (Estonian), Čechi or Čěska (Upper Sorbian), Čechy (Czech, Lower Sorbian, Slovak), Češka (Croatian, Slovenian), Czechy (Polish, Silesian), Pihm - פיהם (Yiddish), Voimía - Βοημία (Greek)
Bohuslän	Bahusia (Latin), Bohus Len(Danish), Båhuslen or Baahuslen (Norwegian), Bohuslän (Estonian, Swedish, Turkish), Bohuslen - Бохуслен (Macedonian)
Brabant	Brabân (Frisian, Western Frisian), Brabän (Volapük), Brabancja (Polish), Brabànt (Emiliano-Romagnolo), Brabant - Брабант (Macedonian, Serbian, Uzbek), Brabant or Brabantul (Romanian), Brabanta (Albanian, Kurdish), Brabantas (Lithuanian), Brabante (Asturian, Basque, Galician, Italian, Latvian, Portuguese, Spanish, Venetian), Brabantia (Latin), Brabanto (Esperanto), Brabantsko (Czech, Slovak), Braebant (Zeelandic), Braibant (Walloon), Braobant (Low German), Braobant or Broabant (Low Saxon), Braobant or Broabantj (Limburgish), Brebant (Arpitan), Broabant (West Flemish), Vravándhi - Βραβάνδη (Greek)
Brandenburg	Braandenbörg or Brannenborg (Low Saxon), Bramborg or Brannenborg (Low German), Bramborska (Lower Sorbian), Brandänburgän (Volapük), Brandeborg (Occitan), Brandeborgh (Piedmontese), Brandeborsch (Colognian), Brandebourg (French), Brandebûrg (Emiliano-Romagnolo), Brandeburg or Brandenburg (Alemannic, Catalan), Brandeburgo (Galician, Guarani, Italian, Tagalog), Brandebùrgo (Lombard), Brandeburgo or Brandemburgo (Portuguese, Spanish), Brandeburgu (Sardinian), Brandebursch (Palatine German), Brandemburgo (Aragonese), Brandemburgu (Asturian), Brandenborg (Icelandic), Brandenborg or Brandenburg (Danish), Brandenborj (Northern Frisian), Brandenburch (Frisian, Western Frisian), Brandenburg - Бранденбург (Macedonian, Serbian, Uzbek), Brandenburg or Brandenburgo (Basque), Brandenburg or Dún Bréanainn (Irish), Brandenburga (Latvian), Brandenburgas (Lithuanian), Brandenburgia (Interlingue, Polish), Brandenburgio (Esperanto), Brandenbùrgiô (Kashubian), Brandenburgo or Brandenbûrgo (Ligurian), Brandenburgu (Albanian, Maltese), Brandenburgum (Latin), Brandenburq (Azerbaijani), Brandenbursko, Braniborsko or Branibory (Slovak), Brandenbuurich (Saterland Frisian), Brandiburgo (Venetian), Brandnbuag (Bavarian), Braniborsko (Czech, Upper Sorbian), Brendebörg (Limburgish), Vradhemvourghon - Βραδεμβουργον (Greek)
Brittany	A' Bhreatainn Bheag (Scottish Gaelic), An Bhriotáin (Irish), Aremorica or Armorica (Classical Latin), Armòrica or Bretanya (Catalan), Armorikí-Vretáni - Αρμορική-Βρετάνη (Greek), Baritani (Minangkabau), Bertaèyn or Bertègn (Gallo), Bertanne (Picard), Breetany (Scots), Breizh (Breton), Bres (Lingua Franca Nova), Bretagna (Italian, Sardinian), Bretagne (Afrikaans, Alemannic, Arpitan, Danish, Dutch, Estonian, Finnish, French, Friulian, German, Hungarian, Interlingue, Javanese, Kabyle, Limburgish, Luxembourgish, Minnan, Norwegian, Swahili, Swedish, Vietnamese), Bretagne, Bretania, Bretland hitt syðra or Syðra-Bretland (Faroese), Bretagne or Kloabritannien (Bavarian), Bretainia (Basque), Bretan (Azerbaijani), Bretaň (Czech), Bretan - Бретан (Uzbek), Bretaña (Asturian, Galician, Spanish), Bretaņa (Latvian), Bretanė (Lithuanian), Bretanha (Occitan, Portuguese), Bretania (Ladin, Polish, Romanian), Bretanie (Low Saxon), Bretanija or Bretanja (Slovenian), Bretaniô (Kashubian), Bretanja (Albanian, Maltese), Bretanja - Бретања (Macedonian, Serbian), Bretanja or Bretonija (Croatian), Bretanja, Bretoniska or Bretonska (Upper Sorbian), Bretanje (Western Frisian), Bretanya (Aragonese, Pampanga, Tagalog), Bretanya or Bretonya (Turkish), Breten Vian (Cornish), Bretland or Lydƿic (Old English), Bretonia (Ido, Indonesian), Bretonio or Bretonujo (Esperanto), Bretonya (Zazaki), Britani (Malay), Britannia (Interlingua), Britannia minor (Medieval Latin), Britannia Minor (Latin), Brittanja (Maltese), Burtaegne (Walloon), Llydaw (Welsh), Peretāne Iti (Tahitian), Pu-lie̍t-thap-nì (Hakka Chinese), Yn Vritaan (Manx)
Bukovina	Boekovina (Dutch), Boekowina (Afrikaans), Buchenland or Bukowina (German), Bucovina (Asturian, Catalan, Italian, Occitan, Spanish), Bucovina or Bucóvina (Portuguese), Bucovina or Bukovina (English, Galician), Bucovina or Silvae Maiores (Latin), Bucovina or Țara de Sus (Romanian), Bucovine (French), Bukoviina (Estonian), Bukovina (Azerbaijani, Basque, Croatian, Czech, Danish, Hungarian, Ido, Indonesian, Latvian, Lithuanian, Low Saxon, Malagasy, Maltese, Norwegian, Slovak, Slovenian, Swedish, Turkish, Vietnamese), Bukovina - Буковина (Macedonian, Russian, Serbian, Uzbek), Bukovina or Pyökkienmaa (Finnish), Bukovino (Esperanto), Bukovyna (Welsh), Bukovyna - Буковина (Ukrainian), Bukowina (Low German, Polish)
Burgenland	Buagnlånd or Burgnland (Bavarian), Burgeland (Alemannic), Burgenland - Бургенланд or Gradišće - Градишће (Serbian), Burgenland - Бургенланд or Gradište - Градиште (Macedonian), Burgenland or Burgenlandi (Albanian), Burgenland, Burgenlandsko or Hradsko (Czech, Slovak), Burgenland or Burguenland (Catalan), Burgenland or Búrguenland (Asturian), Burgenland, Felsőőrvidék, Lajtabánság, Őrvidék or Várvidék (Hungarian), Burgenlandas (Lithuanian), Burgenlande (Latvian), Burgenlandia (Latin), Burgenlândia or Burguenlândia (Portuguese), Burgenlando (Esperanto), Burgnland (Austro-Bavarian), Gradiščanska (Slovenian), Gradišće (Bosnian, Croatian)
Burgundy	an Bhurgúin (Irish), Borgogna (Italian), Borgoña (Spanish), Borgogne (Arpitan), Borgonha (Portuguese), Borgònha (Occitan), Borgonja (Maltese), Borgonya (Catalan), Bourgondië (Dutch), Bourgogne (French), Burgonja (Albanian), Burgonya (Turkish), Burgund (Danish, German, Swedish), Burgundia (Estonian, Hungarian, Polish, Romanian), Burgundija (Croatian, Latvian, Lithuanian, Serbian, Slovene), Burgundija - Бургундија or Burgonj - Бургоњ (Macedonian), Burgundiya - Бургундия (Russian), Burgundsko (Czech), Burgundia (Latin) Burgundi (Finnish), Bwrgwyn (Welsh), Vourghoundhía - Βουργουνδία (Greek)
Burzenland	Țara Bârsei (Romanian), Burcenland - Бурценланд (Macedonian), Burzenland (German, Turkish), Barcaság (Hungarian), Burcenlande (Latvian)

== C ==
English name	Other names or former names
Calabria	Bruttium, Calabria or Calabria hodierna (Latin), Calabbria (Sicilian), Calabbria or Calàbbria (Calabrian), Calâbra (Arpitan), Calabre (French, Picard), Calábria (Portuguese), Calàbria (Catalan, Occitan), Całabria or Całàbria (Venetian), Calabria or Kalaabria (Estonian), Calabria or Kalabria (Faroese), Calabria or Kalabriya (Turkish), Calabrie (Friulian, Scots), Calabrië (Dutch, Limburgish, West Flemish), Calabrien (Danish), Calavria (Neapolitan), Kalaabrien (Northern Frisian), Kalaabrje (Western Frisian), Kalabri (Cornish), Kalabrì (Arbëresh), Kalabria (Albanian, Ido, Ladino, Polish), Kalabría (Icelandic), Kalábria (Hungarian, Slovak), Kalabrië (Afrikaans), Kalábrie (Czech), Kalabrien (Alemannic, German, Luxembourgish, Swedish), Kalabrija (Bosnian, Croatian, Latvian, Lithuanian, Maltese, Slovenian), Kalabrija - Калабрија (Macedonian, Serbian), Kalabrio (Esperanto), Kalabriya (Azerbaijani, Crimean Tatar, Kurdish, Zazaki), Kalabriya - Калабрия (Uzbek), Kalavría - Καλαβρία (Greek), Karaparia (Māori)
Campania	Campània (Catalan, Occitan), Campânia (Portuguese), Campania or Kampaniya (Turkish), Campanie (French, Friulian, Picard, Scots), Campanië (Dutch, Limburgish, West Flemish), Campanien (Danish), Campannia (Ligurian), Canpania or Canpània (Venetian), Kampaanje (Western Frisian), Kampani (Cornish), Kampania (Albanian, Ido, Ladino, Polish), Kampanía (Icelandic), Kampánia (Slovak), Kampanía - Καμπανία (Greek), Kampanië (Afrikaans), Kampánie (Czech), Kampanien (Alemannic, German, Low German, Luxembourgish, Swedish), Kampanija (Bosnian, Croatian, Lithuanian, Slovenian), Kampānija (Latvian), Kampanija - Кампанија (Macedonian, Serbian), Kampanio (Esperanto), Kampaniya (Azerbaijani, Crimean Tatar, Kurdish, Zazaki), Kampanja (Maltese)
Cantabria	Campània (Catalan, Occitan), Campânia (Portuguese), Campania or Kampaniya (Turkish), Campanie (French, Friulian, Picard, Scots), Campanië (Dutch, Limburgish, West Flemish), Campanien (Danish), Campannia (Ligurian), Canpania or Canpània (Venetian), Kampaanje (Western Frisian), Kampani (Cornish), Kampania (Albanian, Ido, Ladino, Polish), Kampanía (Icelandic), Kampánia (Slovak), Kampanía - Καμπανία (Greek), Kampanië (Afrikaans), Kampánie (Czech), Kampanien (Alemannic, German, Low German, Luxembourgish, Swedish), Kampanija (Bosnian, Croatian, Lithuanian, Slovenian), Kampānija (Latvian), Kampanija - Кампанија (Macedonian, Serbian), Kampanio (Esperanto), Kampaniya (Azerbaijani, Crimean Tatar, Kurdish, Zazaki), Kampanja (Maltese)
Carinthia	Carantania or Carinthia (Latin), Carinthie (French), Caríntia (Catalan, Portuguese), Carintia (Romanian, Spanish), Carinzia (Italian), Karinthia (Albanian), Karinthía - Καρινθία (Greek), Karinthië (Dutch), Karintia (Hungarian), Karintija (Latvian, Lithuanian), Karintiya (Turkish), Karinzja (Maltese), Kärnten (Danish, Estonian, Finnish, German, Swedish), Karyntia (Polish), Koroška (Slovene), Korotan (historical variant in Slovene), Koruška (Croatian), Koruška - Корушка (Macedonian, Serbian), Korutany (Czech)
Carnia	Carnia (Italian, Turkish), Cárnia (Portuguese), Cjargne (Friulian), Karnien (German), Karnija - Карнија (Macedonian)
Carniola	Carniola (Catalan, Italian, Latin, Romanian, Spanish), Carníola (Portuguese), Carniole (French), Krain (Danish, Dutch, Finnish, German, Swedish), Kraina (Polish), Krajna (Hungarian), Kranjska (Croatian, Estonian, Slovene, Turkish), Kranjska - Крањска (Macedonian), Kraňsko (Czech)
Castile	Castela (Portuguese), Castella (Catalan), Castiglia (Italian), Castilia (Romanian), Castilien (Danish), Castilla (Spanish), Castille (French), an Chaistíl (Irish), Castilye (Arpitan), Kastija (Albanian), Kastiilia (Estonian), Kastilia (Finnish), Kastilie / Kastilsko (Czech), Kastilië (Dutch), Kastilien (German, Swedish), Kastīlija (Latvian), Kastilija (Lithuanian, Slovene), Kastilja (Croatian, Maltese), Kastilja - Кастилја (Macedonian, Serbian), Kastilli - Καστιλλη (Greek), Kastilya (Turkish), Kastylia (Polish), Kasztília (Hungarian)
Catalonia	Catalogna (Italian), Catalogne (Arpitan, French, Walloon), Catalonha (Occitan), Catalonia (English, Latin, Romanian), Catalonië (Dutch), Catalonien (Danish), Cataluña (Spanish), Catalunha (Portuguese), Catalunya (Catalan), an Chatalóin (Irish), Katalánsko (Czech), Katalonía - Καταλωνία (Greek), Katalónia (Hungarian), Katalonia (Albanian, Breton, Finnish, Polish), Katalonien (German, Swedish), Katalonija (Croatian, Latvian, Lithuanian, Slovene), Katalonija - Каталонија (Macedonian, Serbian), Katalonja (Maltese), Katalonya (Turkish), Kataloonia (Estonian), Katalunio (Esperanto)
Champagne	Champagne (Danish, Dutch, Estonian, Finnish, French, German, Hungarian, Irish, Italian, Romanian, Swedish, Turkish), Champanhe ou Champanha (Portuguese), Champaña (Spanish), Kampáni - Καμπάνη (Greek), Šampaņa (Latvian), Šampanė (Lithuanian), Šampanija (Slovene), Šampanja - Шампања (Macedonian), Sciampagna (old Italian), Shampanja (Albanian), Szampania (Polish), Tchampagne (Walloon), Xampanja (Maltese) Xampanya (Catalan)
Chechnya	Čečenija - Чеченија (Macedonian), Çeçenia (Albanian), Çeçenistan or Çeçenya or İçkerya (Turkish), Ċeċnija (Maltese), an tSeisnia (Irish), Tchétchénie (French), Txetxènia (Catalan), Chechénia (Portuguese), Chechnya - Чечня (Russian), Chechenia (Spanish), Tchetchênia (Brazilian Portuguese variant), Tšetšenia (Finnish)
Chełmno Land	Culmerland (variant in German), Culmland (variant in English), Kulmerland (Dutch, German, Hungarian, Turkish), Ziemia Chełmińska (Polish)
Chod region	Chodenland (German), Chodovia (Latin), Chod region (English), Chodsko (Czech), Ziemia Chodzka (Polish)
Cerdanya	Cerdanya (Catalan), Cerdagne (French) (see also French Cerdagne), Cerdaña (Spanish), Cerdanha (Portuguese), Serdanija - Серданија or Serdanja - Сердања (Macedonian)
Cornwall	Kernow (Cornish), Cernyw (Welsh), Corn na Breataine (Irish), Cornouailles (French), Cornovaglia (Italian), Cornualha (Portuguese), Cornualla (Catalan), Cornualles (variant in Catalan, Spanish), Cornwall (Croatian, Danish, Dutch, Estonian, Finnish, German, Hungarian, Romanian, Swedish, Turkish), Kernev-Veur (Breton), Kernevekeli (Turkish alternate), Kornouálli - Κορνουάλλη (Greek), Kornvalo (Esperanto), Kornvol - Корнвол (Macedonian, Serbian), Kornvola (Latvian), Kornwalia (Polish), Kornwall (variant in German) Further information: List of foreign-language names for Cornwall
Corsica	an Chorsaic (Irish), Corsica (Corsican, Dutch, Italian, Latin, Romanian), Corsa (Arpitan), Corse (French), Còrsega (Catalan), Córsega (Portuguese), Córcega (Spanish), Korsika - Корсика (Bulgarian), Korsika (Albanian, Breton, Czech, Danish, Estonian, Faroese, Finnish, German, Latvian, Lithuanian, Maltese, Swedish, Turkish), Korsikí - Κορσική (Greek), Korsyka (Polish), Korzika (Croatian, Hungarian, Slovene), Korzika - Корзика (Macedonian, Serbian), Korsikujo or Korsikio (Esperanto)
Courland	Courlande (French), Couronia or Curonia (variants in English), Curlanda (variant in Catalan, Romanian), Curlandia (Italian, Spanish), Curlàndia (Catalan), Curlândia (Portuguese), an Chúróin (Irish), Koerland (Dutch), Kuramaa (Estonian), Kurland (Danish, Faroese, German, Hungarian, Swedish, variant in English), Kúrland (Icelandic), Kurland - Курланд / Kurzeme - Курземе / Kurlandija - Курландија / Kuronija - Куронија (Macedonian), Kurlandia (Polish), Kurlandiya (Turkish), Kuronsko (Czech), Kurzeme (Latvian), Kuurinmaa (Finnish), Kuršas (Lithuanian)
Crete	Candia (former Italian), an Chréit (Irish), Creta (Catalan, Italian, Latin, Portuguese, Romanian, Spanish, Welsh), Crète (French), Girit (Turkish), Kandia (former Turkish), Kreeta (Estonian, Finnish), Kréta (Czech, Slovak, Hungarian), Kreta (Albanian, Croatian, Danish, Dutch, Faroese, German, Lithuanian, Maltese, Polish, Slovene, Swedish), Krēta (Latvian), Krétim - כרתים (Hebrew), Krit - Крит (Macedonian, Serbian), Kríti - Κρήτη (Greek)
Crimea	an Chrimé (Irish), Crimea (Catalan, Italian, Spanish), Crimeea (Romanian), Crimeia (Portuguese), Crimée (French), Crimêye (Walloon), Kırım (Turkish), Krim (Croatian, Danish, Dutch, Faroese, Finnish, German, Hungarian, Swedish, Slovene), Krim - Крим (Macedonian, Serbian), Krim - קרים (Yiddish), Krima (Latvian), Kriméa - Κριμέα (Greek), Krimea (Albanian, Maltese), Krimeo (Esperanto), Krimm (Estonian), Krym (Polish, Czech), Krim - Крым (Russian), Krym - Крим (Ukrainian), Krymas (Lithuanian), Qırım (Crimean Tatar, Tatar)
Cumbria	Cumbria (Estonian, Finnish, Hungarian, Italian, Latin, Romanian, Spanish, Swedish, Turkish), Cúmbria (Catalan, Portuguese), Cumbrie (French), Cumbrien (variant in Swedish), Cwmry (Cumbric), Kumbrija (Latvian, Maltese), Kumbrija - Кумбрија (Macedonian), Kumbrio (Esperanto)
Czechia	Čeahkka (Northern Saami), Cechia (Italian), Cechia / Czechia (variants in Latin), Cecland (Anglo-Saxon), Cehia (Romanian), Čehija (Latvian), Čehija - Чэхія (Belarusian), Čehija - Чexия (Bulgarian, Kazakh, Kyrgyz, Russian), Čehija - Чexiя (Ukrainian), Ĉeĥio (Esperanto), Çehiya (Crimean Tatar), Čehmastor - Чехмастор (Moksha), Ċeka (Maltese), Çekia (Albanian), Čekija (Lithuanian), Çekıstan (Dimli), Çekya / Çek Cumhuriyeti (Turkish), Češka (Croatian, Serbian, Slovenian), Češka - Чeшкa (Serbian), Češka - Чешка / Čehija - Чexиja (Macedonian), Čěska (Sorbian), Česko (Czech, Slovak), Češ'sko - Чєшьско (Old Church Slavonic), Çexiya (Azerbaijani), Chequia (Spanish), Chéquia (Portuguese), Chexiya (Uzbek), Csehország (Hungarian), Czechy (Polish), Czeskô (Kashubian), Kekkia (Faeroese), an tSeicia (Irish), Tchéquia (Brazilian Portuguese), Tchéquie (French), Tékkland (Icelandic), Tjeckien (Swedish), Tjekkiet (Danish), Tschechia (Romansh), Tschechei (Luxembourgish, Yiddish, variant in German), Tschecherei (Pennsylvania German), Tschechien (German), Tsechía - Τσεχία (Greek), Tšehhi (Estonian), Tšekki (Finnish), Tshecia (Welsh), Tsjechië (Dutch), Tsjekkia (Norwegian), Txekia (Basque), Txèquia (Catalan), Tzechia (Latin)

== D ==
English name	Other names or former names
Dalecarlia	Dalarna (Czech, Danish, Dutch, variant in English, Estonian, Swedish, Turkish), Dālarna (Latvian), Dalarna - Даларна / Dalekarlija - Далекарлија (Macedonian), Dalecarlia (English, Italian, Latin), Dalecárlia (Portuguese), Dalécarlie (French), Dalekarlien (German), Taalainmaa (Finnish)
Dalsland	Dalia (Italian, Latin), Dália (Portuguese), Dalie(French), Dalsland (Danish, Estonian, German, Hungarian, Swedish, Turkish), Dalsland - Далсланд (Macedonian), Dālslande (Latvian)
Dalmatia	Dalmacija (Croatian, Slovene), Dalmaatsia (Estonian), Dalmacia (Albanian, Spanish), Dalmàcia (Catalan), Dalmácia (Hungarian, Portuguese, Slovak), Dalmácie (Czech), Dalmācija (Latvian), Dalmacija - Далмација (Macedonian, Serbian), Dalmacja (Polish), Dalmaçya (Turkish), an Dalmáit (Irish), Dalmatia (Finnish, Latin), Dalmatie (French), Dalmatië (Dutch), Dalmátország (Hungarian alternate), Dalmatien (Danish, German, Swedish), Dalmaţia (Romanian), Dalmazia (Italian), Dalmazja (Maltese), Dhalmatía - Δαλματία (Greek)
Dauphiné	Dârfénât (Arpitan), Daufinat (Occitan), Dauphiné (Dutch, Estonian, French, German, Hungarian, Romanian, Swedish, Turkish), Dauphiné or Delfinado (Portuguese), Delfinado (Spanish), Delfinat (Catalan, Maltese, Polish), Delfinato (Italian), Delphinatus (Latin), Dhelfináton - Δελφινατον (Greek), Dofine - Дофине (Macedonian)
Dobruja	Dhovroutsá - Δοβρουτσά (Greek), Dobroedzja (Dutch), Dobrogea (Finnish, Romanian, Swedish), Dobroudja (French), Dobruca (Turkish), Dobrudja (Catalan, variant in English), Dobrudscha (German), Dobrudža (Croatian, Czech, Estonian, Latvian, Slovene), Dobrudža - Добруџа (Macedonian, Serbian), Dobrudża (Polish), Dobrudža - Добруджа (Bulgarian), Dobrudzsa (Hungarian), Dobrugia (Italian), Dobruja (Portuguese, Spanish), Scythia Minor (Latin)
Drenthe	Drende (Catalan), Drente (Latvian, Portuguese), Drente - Дренте (Macedonian), Drenthe (Czech, Danish, Dutch, Estonian, French, German, Turkish), Drinte (Frisian)

== E ==
English name	Other names or former names
Emilia-Romagna	Aemilia and Romania (Latin), Emilia-Romagna (Danish, Dutch, German, Hungarian, Irish, Italian, Romanian, Turkish), Emilia Romagna (Estonian), Emilia-Romaña (Spanish), Emília-Romanha (Portuguese), Emilía-Románia - Εμιλια-Ρωμανια (Greek), Emilia-Romania (Polish), Èmilia-Romagne (Arpitan), Emilia-Romanja (Albanian), Emília-Romanya (Catalan), Émilie-Romagne (French), Emīlija-Romaņa (Latvian), Emilija-Romanja - Емилија-Ромања (Macedonian), Emilja-Romanja (Maltese)
England	Angel'shchyna - Ангельшчына (Belarusian variant), Anghiltèra (Piedmontese), Anglaterra (Aragonese, Catalan, Interlingua), Anglatèrra (Occitan), Angletè (Haitian Creole), Angleterre (French), Anglletèrra (Arpitan), Angli - Англи (Chuvash), Anglia (Albanian, Aromanian, Hungarian, Ido, Latin, Polish, Romanian), Anglía - Αγγλία (Greek), Anglicko (Slovak), Anglie (Czech, Friulian), Angliétèrre (Norman), Anglija (Latvian, Lithuanian, Slovenian), Anglija - Англија (Macedonian), Anglio or Anglujo (Esperanto), Anglis - Англис (Ossetian), Angliya (Uzbek), Angliya - Англия (Bulgarian, Kazakh, Kyrgyz, Russian, Tajik, Tatar), Angliya - Англія (Belarusian, Ukrainian), Änglound (Saterland Frisian), Anh (Vietnamese), Bro-Saoz (Breton), Engalterra (Rumantsch Grischun), Engelaand (Dutch Low Saxon), Engeland (Afrikaans, Dutch), Engelane (Sesotho), Engelska (Lower Sorbian), Englaland (Anglo-Saxon), England (Alemannic, Austro-Bavarian, Danish, German, Icelandic, Low German, Luxembourgish, Malay, Norwegian, Swedish, Tsonga), Englánda (Saami), Englanti (Finnish), Engleska (Bosnian, Croatian), Engleska - Енглеска (Serbian), Eng-tē (Min Nan), Iengeland (West Flemish), Ilẹ̀gẹ̀ẹ́sì (Yoruba), Ingalaterra (Basque, Extremaduran), Ingarangi (Maori), Ingelân (Frisian), Ingeland (Limburgish), Ingɛlandi (Lingala), INgesi (Xhosa), Ing-geullaendeu - 잉글랜드 (Korean), Inggréh (Acèh), Inggris (Indonesian, Javanese, Sundanese), Inghiltera (Venetian), Inghiltèra (Lombard), Inghilterra (Italian, Sardinian), Inghiltæra (Ligurian), INgilandi (Zulu), ʻIngilani (Tongan), Ingilîstan (Kurdish), Ingilterra (Maltese), İngiltere (Turkish), İngiltərə (Azerbaijani), Inglan (Tok Pisin), Ingland (Pitcairn Creole, Scots, Low German), Inglatera (Cebuano, Chavacano, Papiamento, Tagalog), Inglaterra (Asturian, Galician, Kapampangan, Portuguese, Spanish, Tetum, Waray-Waray), Inglatlālpan (Nahuatl), Inglishin Tangghch - Инглишин Таңһч (Kalmyk), Inglismaa (Estonian), Inglüsmaa (Võro), Ingriis (Somalian), Ingurando - イングランド (Japanese), Ingyaterra (Guaraní), Inlatirra (Quechua), Jendźelska (Upper Sorbian), Linglän (Volapük), Lloegr (Welsh), Ngilandi (Swazi), Nglaterra (Sicilian), Ngreterra (Neapolitan), Ngyiresi (Akan), Ongland (Faroese), Onglėjė (Samogitian), Pow Sows (Cornish), Sasainn (Scottish Gaelic), Sasana (Irish), Sostyn (Manx), Uingereza (Swahili), Yīnggélán - 英格兰 (Mandarin Chinese), Yngland (Silesian)
Epirus	Çamëria (Albanian), Epeiros (Finnish), Epir (Albanian variant, Croatian, Polish, Romanian, Slovene, Turkish), Epir - Епир (Macedonian, Serbian), Epīra (Latvian), Épire (French), Epiro (Italian, Esperanto, Spanish), Épiro (Portuguese), Èpir (Catalan), Epirosz (Hungarian), Epiru (Maltese), Epirus (Danish, Dutch, German, Latin, Swedish), Ípeiros (Estonian), Ípiros - Ήπειρος (Greek)
Euboea	Eğriboz (Turkish), Eubea (Catalan, Italian, Polish, Spanish), Eubée (French), Eubeea (Romanian), Eubeia (Portuguese), Eubeja (Croatian), Euböa (German), Euboea (Dutch, Irish, Latin), Euboia (Estonian, Swedish, Finnish), Evbeja - Евбеја / Evija - Евија (Macedonian), Évia (Hungarian), Évvia - Ευβοια (Greek), Evvoia (variant in Irish), Negroponte (former Italian)

== F ==
English name	Other names or former names
Faroe Islands	Føroyar (Faroese), Færeyjar (Icelandic), Færøyane (Norwegian nynorsk), Færøyene (Norwegian bokmål), Færøerne (Danish), Fääri saared (Estonian), Färöarna (Swedish), Faeröer (Dutch), Faroe Adaları (Turkish), Färöer (German), Farski Ostrovi - Фарски Острови (Macedonian), Faerské ostrovy (Czech, Slovak), Farēru salas or Fēru salas (Latvian), Farerų salos (Lithuanian), Färsaaret (Finnish), Farska Ostrva (Serbian), Feróes Nisoi - Φερόες Νησοι (Greek), Ferooj (Esperanto), Feröer-szigetek (Hungarian), Ferski otoki (Slovene), na h-Eileanan Fàrach (Scots Gaelic), il-Gżejjer Faroe (Maltese), Îles Féroé (French), Ilhas Faroés or Ilhas Feroé or Ilhas Féroes (Portuguese), Iles Fèroè (Arpitan), Illes Fèroe (Catalan), Insulele Faroe (Romanian), Ishujt Faroe (Albanian), Islas Feroe (Spanish), Isole Fær Øer (Italian), Farski otoci (informal Croatian), Oileáin Fharó (Irish), Ovčji otoci (official Croatian, rarely used), Schafsinseln (German), na Scigirí (variant in Irish), Wyspy Owcze (Polish)
Southwest Finland	Dienvidrietumsomija (Latvian), Egentliga Finland (Swedish), Egentlige Finland (Danish), Finlanda Jugperëndimore (Albanian), Finlande propre (French), Finlandia Meridionalis or Finlandia Propria (Latin), Finlandia Propria (Italian), Finlândia Própria or Finlândia do Sudoeste (Portuguese), Güneybatı Finlandiya (Turkish), Iardheisceart na Fionlainne (Irish), Iskonska Finska - Исконска Финска / Jugozapadna Finska - Југозападна Финска (Macedonian), Päris-Soome (Estonian), Varsinais-Suomi (Finnish)
Finnmark	Finamarca (Portuguese), Finmark - Финмарк (Macedonian), Finmarka (Albanian, Latvian), Finnmark (Dutch, Estonian, French, German, Hungarian, Italian, Norwegian, Romanian, Spanish, Swedish, Turkish), Finnmarken (Danish), Finnmárku (Sami), Finnmörk (Icelandic), Ruija (Finnish)
Flanders	Fiandra or Fiandre (Italian), Fjandra (Maltese), Flamandhía - Φλαμανδία (Greek), Flámsko (Slovak), Flande (Walloon), Flanderi (Finnish), Flandern (Danish, German, Swedish), Flandes (Catalan, Spanish), Flandra (Romanian), Flandre / Flandra / Flaman Ovası (Turkish), Flandre or Flandres (French), Flandres (Portuguese), Flandrez (Breton), Flandria (Albanian, Estonian, Hungarian, Latin, Polish), Flandrija (Croatian, Latvian, Lithuanian), Flandrija - Фландрија (Macedonian, Serbian), Flandrio or Flandrujo (Esperanto), Flandry (Czech), Flandrys (Welsh), Flandur or Flæmingjaland (Icelandic), Flóndras (Irish), Vlaanderen (Dutch); Note: several languages have a plural form and a singular form, with different geographical scope
Franche-Comté	Franca Contea (Italian), Franc-Comtat (Catalan), Franche-Comtât (Arpitan), Franche-Comté (Estonian, French, Romanian, Turkish), Franco-Condado (Portuguese), Franco Condado (Spanish), Franš-Konte - Франш-Конте (Macedonian), Freigrafschaft Burgund (German until the 17th century), Comitatus Burgundiae (Medieval Latin), Liber Comitatus (Latin)
Franconia	an Fhrancóin (Irish), Frankonía - Φραγκωνία (Greek), Franačka (Croatian), Franconia (Italian, Latin, Romanian, Spanish), Francónia (Portuguese), Francònia (Catalan), Francônia (Brazilian Portuguese), Franconie (French), Frangimaa (Estonian), Franken (Danish, Finnish), Franken or Frankenland (Dutch, German, Norwegian, Swedish), Frankföld (Hungarian), Frankonia (Albanian, Polish), Frankonija (Latvian), Frankonija - Франконија (Macedonian), Frankonja (Maltese), Frankonya (Turkish), Franky (Czech)
Friesland	an Fhreaslainn (Irish), Friesland (Dutch, English, German, Indonesian, Norwegian, Swedish), Friisimaa (Estonian), Friisinmaa (Finnish), Frísaland (Faroese), Frise (French), Frísia (Catalan, Portuguese), Frisía - Φρισία (Greek), Frisia (Italian, Latin, Spanish), Frisia or Frislanda (Romansh), Frísko (Czech), Frisland (Danish), Frislandiya - Фрисландия (Russian), Frislando (Esperanto), Frízföld (Hungarian), Frizia (Romanian), Frizija (Croatian), Frizija - Фризија / Frisland - Фрисланд (Macedonian), Frīzlande (Latvian), Frizya (Turkish), Fryslân (Frisian), Fryzja (Polish)
Friuli	Forum Iulii, Foroiulium or Forum Iulium (Latin), Friaul (German, Hungarian), Friôl (Arpitan), Frioul (French), Frioulía - Φριουλία (Greek), Friül (Catalan), Friûl (Friulian), Friul (Spanish, variant in Romanian), Friul or Friúlia (Portuguese), Friuli (Dutch, Estonian, Irish, Italian, Latvian, Maltese, Polish, Romanian, Turkish), Furlanija (Croatian, Slovene), Furlanija - Фурланија (Macedonian), Furlánsko (Czech)
Funen	Fyn (Danish, Estonian, Norwegian, Swedish, Esperanto, Finnish, Hungarian, Romanian, Turkish), Fjón (Faroese, Icelandic), Funen (Dutch, Turkish alternate), Fünen (German), Fin - Фин (Macedonian), Fionia (Italian, Polish, Spanish, variant in Romanian), Fiònia (Catalan), Fiónia (Portuguese), Fiônia (Brazilian Portuguese), Fionie (French)

== G ==
English name	Other names or former names
Galicia (Central Europe)	Gácsország (variant in Hungarian), Galicia (Hungarian, Latin), Galicia (Spanish), Galícia (Portuguese), Galicië (Dutch), Galicie (French), Galicija (Croatian, Slovene), Galicija - Галиција (Macedonian), Galicja (Polish), Galiçya (Turkish), Galiitsia (Estonian), Galiţia (Romanian), Galitsia (Finnish), Galítsia (Catalan), Galitsiya - Галиция (Russian), Galitsyen - גאַליציען (Yiddish), Galizia (Italian), Galizien (Danish, German, Swedish), Galizja (Maltese), an Ghailís (Irish), Halič (Czech), Halici (variant in Romanian), Halics (variant in Hungarian), Halychyna - Галичина (Ukrainian), Puna-Venäjä (historical Finnish)
Galicia (Spain)	Gallaecia (Latin), Galice (French), Galícia (Catalan), Galicia (Albanian, Estonian, Finnish, Galician, Hungarian, variant in Romanian, Spanish), Galícia (variant in Portuguese), Galicie (Czech), Galicië (Dutch), Galicien (Danish, German, Swedish), Galicija - Галиција (Macedonian, Serbian), Galicja or Galisja (Polish), Galiçya (Turkish), Galiţia (Romanian), Galiza (alternative Galician name, Portuguese), Galizia (Italian), Galizja (Maltese), Gal·lècia (old Catalan), an Ghailís (Irish), Ghallikía - Γαλλικία (Greek), Goualice (Arpitan)
Gascony	Gascogne (French, Danish, Dutch, Estonian, Finnish, Hungarian, Swedish, variant in Romanian), Gasconha (Occitan, Portuguese), Gasconia (Latin, Romanian), Gasconya and Gascunya (Catalan), Gascuña (Spanish), Gasgwyn (Welsh), Gaskonia (Polish), Gaskonja - Гаскоња (Macedonian, Serbian), Gaskonya (Turkish), an Ghascóin (Irish), Guascogna (Italian), Gaskoňsko (Czech), Ghaskonía - Γασκονία (Greek), Vasconia (Medieval Latin)
Gelderland	Gelderlân (Frisian), Gelderland (Danish, Dutch, Estonian, Finnish, German, Hungarian, Swedish, Turkish), Gelderland - Гелдерланд (Macedonian), Gelre (historical Dutch), Gheldria (Italian), Guelders or Gueldres (alternative English name), Güelda or Güeldes (Catalan), Gueldre (French), Güeldres (Spanish), Guéldria (Portuguese), Geldria (Polish)
Gästrikland	Gästrikland (Estonian, Swedish, Turkish), Gestricia (Latin), Gestricie (French), Gestriklanti (Finnish), Gestrekaland (Old West Norse), Jestrikland - Јестрикланд (Macedonian)
Götaland	Gautlönd or Gautaland (Icelandic), Götaland (Dutch, Estonian, French, Hungarian, Italian, Swedish, Turkish), Gotalândia (Portuguese), Götamaa (Estonian alternate), Gothia (Latin), Göötanmaa (Finnish), Geatland (variant in English), Götland (German), Gotlandia (Polish), Gotlàndia (Catalan), Jetaland - Јеталанд (Macedonian)
Gotland	Gotland (Danish, Dutch, Faroese, French, German, Hungarian, Irish, Romanian, Italian, Swedish, Turkish), Gotland - Готланд (Macedonian), Gotlanda (Catalan), Gotlandas (Lithuanian), Gotlandia (Latin, Polish), Gotlândia (Portuguese), Gotlanti (Finnish), Gutland (Gutnish), Ojamaa (Estonian)
Graubünden	Graubinden - Граубинден / Grizon - Гризон (Macedonian), Graubünden (Danish, Dutch, Estonian, Finnish, German, Hungarian, Romanian, Swedish, Turkish, variant in English), Grauwbunderland (former Dutch), Gresons (Arpitan), Grigioni (Italian), Grischun (Romansh), Grisões (Portuguese), Grisonia (Latin), Grisons or els Grisons (Catalan), Grisons (French), Grisones (Spanish), Grizono (Esperanto), Gryzonia (Polish), Grisun (Lombard)
Greater Poland	Büyük Polonya (Turkish), Golema Polska - Голема Полска (Macedonian), Gran Polonia (Spanish), Gran Polonja (Maltese) Grande Polonia or Posnania (Italian), Grande-Pologne (French), Grande Polónia (Portuguese), Grande Polônia (Brazilian Portuguese), Gran-Polònia (Catalan), Great Poland (variant in English), Groot-Polen (Dutch), Großpolen (German), Megháli Polonía - Μεγάλη Πολωνία (Greek), Nagy-Lengyelország (Hungarian), an Pholainn Mhór (Irish), Polonia Maior (Latin), Polonia Mare (Romanian), Storpolen (Danish, Swedish), Wielkopolska (Polish), Velkopolsko (Czech), Suur-Poola (Estonian), Suur-Puola (Finnish)
Groningen	Groningen (Dutch, Danish, Estonian, Finnish, German, Hungarian, Romanian, Swedish, Turkish), Groningen - Гронинген (Macedonian), Groningue (French), Groninga (Catalan, Italian, Portuguese, Spanish), Grinslân (Frisian), Grönnen / Grunnen / Grunn'n (Gronings)

== H ==
English name	Other names or former names
Hainaut	Eno - Ено (Macedonian), Hainaut (Danish, Estonian, Finnish, French, Hungarian, Italian, Norwegian, Portuguese, Romanian, Turkish), Henegavsko (Czech), Henegouwen (Dutch), Henegovia (Latin), Hennegau (German), Henao (Spanish), Hinnot (Walloon)
Halland	Chalandhía - Χαλανδία (Greek), Haland - Халанд (Macedonian), Halândia (Portuguese), Halland (Danish, Dutch, Estonian, French, Hungarian, Italian, Swedish, Turkish), Hallandia (Latin), Hallanti (Finnish)
Hälsingland	Hälsingland (Dutch, Estonian, Swedish, Turkish), Helsingia (Latin), Helsíngia (Portuguese, rare), Helsingland (French), Helsingland - Хелсингланд (Macedonian), Helsinglanti (Finnish), Helsingjaland (Old West Norse)
Hanakia	Gana - Гана (Russian), Hana (Croatian, variant in Latin, Polish), Hana - Хана (Macedonian, Serbian), Haná (Czech, Slovak), Hana - Гана (Ukrainian), Hana - Хана (Serbian), Hanácko (variant in Czech), Hanac'ko - Ганацько (variant Ukrainian), Hanakei (variant in German), Hanakia (English, Latin), Hanakien (variant in German), Hanakio (Esperanto), Hanaquie (French), Haná region (variant in English), Hanna (Dutch, German, variant in Latin)
Härjedalen	Härjedalen (Estonian, Swedish, Turkish), Herdalia (Latin), Herdália (Portuguese), Herdalie (French), Herjedalen (Danish, Norwegian), Herjedalen - Херједален (Macedonian), Herjeådalen (Trøndersk, IOW the regional name), Herjárdalr (Old West Norse), Härjedaelie (Sami)
Herzegovina	Erzeghovíni - Ερζεγοβίνη (Greek), Erzegovina (Italian), an Heirseagaivéin (Irish), Hercegovina (Albanian, Bosnian, Catalan, Danish, Dutch, Croatian, Czech, Hungarian, Lithuanian, Norwegian, Slovak, Slovene, Swedish), Hercegovina - Герцеговина (Belarusian, Russian), Hercegovina - Херцеговина (Bulgarian, Macedonian, Serbian), Hercegovino (Esperanto), Hercegowina (Polish), Herdzegovine (Walloon), Hersegovina (Faroese), Hersegóvína (Icelandic), Hersek (Turkish), Herţegovina (Romanian), Hertsegofina (Welsh), Hertsegoviina (Estonian), Hertsegovina (Finnish), Herzegovina (Basque, Latin, Portuguese, Spanish), Ħerżegovina (Maltese), Herzégovine (French), Herzegowina (German)
Hesse	Assia (Italian), Éssi - Έσση (Greek), Hassia (Latin), Hesen - Хесен (Macedonian), Hesensko (Czech), Hessa (Romanian), Hèssa (Arpitan), Hessen (Afrikaans, Croatian, Danish, Dutch, Estonian, Faroese, Finnish, Frisian, German, Hungarian, Irish, Low Saxon, Norwegian, Slovene, Swedish, variant in Romanian, Turkish), Hesse (French, Portuguese, Spanish), Hesja (Polish)
Hiiumaa	Dagø (Danish), Dagö (German, Swedish), Dago (Polish, historical), Hiidenmaa (Finnish), Hiiu (Estonian alternate), Hiiumaa (Dutch, Estonian, French, Hungarian, Italian, Portuguese, Romanian, Turkish), Hiuma (modern Polish), Hiuma - Хиума / Hijuma - Хијума (Macedonian)
Holland	Batavia (Latin variant), Belanda (Indonesian, Malay), Holland (Danish, Dutch, Estonian, Faroese, German, Icelandic, Swedish), Holanda (Albanian, Arpitan, Catalan, Portuguese, Spanish), Holandia (Polish), Holandija (Slovene), Holandija - Холандија (Macedonian, Serbian), Holandsko (Czech, Slovak), Hollân (Frisian), Hollanda (Turkish), Hollande (French), Hollandia (Hungarian, Latin), Hollanti (Finnish), an Òlaind (Scots Gaelic), Olanda (Italian, Maltese, Romanian), Olandija (Lithuanian), an Ollainn (Irish), Ollanda (Romansh), Ollandhía - Ολλανδία (Greek) Note: Holland is a former county and region comprising two modern provinces of the Netherlands, although the name is often used to refer to the whole Dutch realm. Holland is also a former kingdom (1806–1810) comprising approximately the territory of the modern Netherlands
Holstein	Holsatia (Latin), Holsácia (Portuguese variant), Holsetaland (Icelandic), Holstein (Afrikaans, Croatian, Dutch, Estonian, Finnish, French, Frisian, German, Hungarian, Italian, Norwegian, Portuguese variant, Romanian, Slovene, Spanish, Swedish, Turkish), Holštajn - Холштајн (Macedonian), Holsteen (Low Saxon), Holsten (Danish), Holštýnsko (Czech), Holsztyn (Polish)

== I ==
English name	Other names or former names
Île-de-France	Insula Franciae (Latin), Il de Frans - Ил де Франс (Macedonian), Île-de-France (Dutch, Estonian, French, German, Romanian, Swedish, Turkish), Isola di Francia (Italian), Ilha de França (Portuguese), Isla de Francia (Spanish), Illa de França (Catalan)
Ingria	Ingeri (Estonian), Ingerimaa (Estonian alternate), Ingermanland (Danish, German, Swedish), Ingermanlandia - Ингерманландия (Russian), Ingria (Albanian, Italian, Latin, Romanian, Spanish, Turkish), Íngria (Catalan, Portuguese), Ingrie (French), Ingrija - Ингрија (Macedonian), Inkeri (Finnish, Ingrian), Inkerya (Turkish alternate)
Istria	Histria (Latin), İstirya (Turkish), Istra (Croatian, Estonian, Slovene), Istra - Истра (Macedonian, Serbian), an Istria (Irish), Ístria (Catalan, Portuguese), Istria (Albanian, Estonian alternate, Finnish, Italian, Polish, Romanian, Spanish), Istría - Ιστρία (Greek), Istrië (Dutch), Istrie (French, Czech), Istrien (Danish, German, Swedish), Istrija (Maltese),Isztria (Hungarian)

== J ==
English name	Other names or former names
Jämtland	Iempterland (French), Jamtaland (Icelandic, Old West Norse), Jämtland (Dutch, Estonian, German, Swedish, Turkish), Jämtlanti (Finnish), Jemtia (Latin), Jemtland (Danish, Norwegian), Jemtland - Јемтланд(Macedonian), Jamtland/Jamplann (Normalized/Traditional Jamtlandic), Jemtlândia (Portuguese, rare), Jiemhte (Sami)
Jura	Giura (Italian), Jura (Arpitan, Czech, Dutch, Estonian, French, German, Hungarian, Irish, Latin, Polish, Portuguese, Romanian, Turkish), Jura - Јура(Macedonian)
Jutland	an Iútlainn (Irish), Iutlanda (Romanian), Jitland - Јитланд / Jiland - Јиланд (Macedonian), Jótland (Icelandic), Jutland (Afrikaans, Dutch, French, Italian, Turkish), Jútland (Faroese), Jütland (German, Hungarian), Jutlandia (Latin, Polish, Spanish), Jutlàndia (Catalan), Jutlândia (Portuguese), Jutsko (Czech), Jüütimaa (Estonian), Jylland (Danish, Norwegian, Swedish), Jyllanti (Finnish)

== K ==
English name	Other names or former names
Kainuu	Caiânia (Portuguese, rare), Cajanie (French), Kainu - Каину (Macedonian), Kainuu (Estonian, Finnish, Italian, Turkish), Kajanaland (Swedish)
Karelia	Carelia (Italian, Romanian, Spanish), Carèlia (Catalan), Carélia (Portuguese), Carélie (French), an Chairéil (Irish), Karelen (Danish, Swedish), Karélia (Hungarian), Karelia (Albanian, Latin, Polish), Kareliâ - Карелия (Russian), Karelië (Afrikaans, Dutch), Karélie (Czech), Karelien (German), Karelija (Croatian), Karelija - Карелија (Macedonian), Karelja (Maltese), Karelya (Turkish), Karjala (Estonian, Finnish, Karelian)
Kashubia	Cachoubie (French), Cachubia (Spanish alternate), Caixúbia (Catalan), Cashubia (variant in English), Cassubia (Latin, Italian, Spanish), Cassúbia or Cachúbia (Portuguese), Casubia (Spanish alternate), an Chaisiúibia (Irish), Kaschubei or Kaschubien (German), Kasjoebië (Afrikaans, Dutch), Kasjubia (Norwegian), Kasjubien (Swedish), Kasubia (Hungarian, Finnish), Kaşubia (Romanian), Kashubia (Albanian), Kašubija - Кашубия (Russian), Kašubija - Кашубија (Macedonian), Kašubija (Slovene), Kašubsko (Czech), Kašuubia (Estonian alternate), Kaşubya (Turkish), Kaszëbë or Kaszëbskô (Kashubian), Kaszuby (Estonian, Polish)
Kola	Kola (Dutch, French, German, Italian, Portuguese, Romanian), Kola - Кола (Macedonian), Kolahalvøen (Danish), Kolahalvön (Swedish), Kola yarımadası (Turkish), Kol'skij poluostrov - Кольский полуостров (Russian), Koola (Estonian), Kuola (Finnish)
Kosovo	Ager Merula or Cassovia (Latin), an Chosaiv (Irish), Kosova (Turkish), Kosovë or Kosova (Albanian), Kosovo i Metohija - Косово и Метохија (Serbian), Kosovo (Estonian, Finnish, German, Maltese), Kosovo - Косово (Macedonian), Kosovo or Kosova (Faroese), Kosovo or Kossovo (French), Kosovo or Cosovo (Portuguese), Kosowo (Polish), Kossowo-Metochien or Kosowo-Metochien (German until 1974), Rigómező or Koszovó (Hungarian)
Kuyavia	Cuiavia (Italian, Latin, variant in English), Cujávia (Portuguese), Cujavie (French), Cuyavia (Spanish), Kujaavia (Estonian alternate), Kujavia (Finnish, Hungarian), Kujaviјa - Кујавија (Macedonian), Kujawien (German), Kujawy (Estonian, Polish), Kuyavya (Turkish)

== L ==
English name	Other names or former names
Lachia	Lachei (German), Lachia (Latin), Lachija - Лахия (Russian), Lašsko (Czech, Slovak), Laszczyzna (Polish)
Languedoc	Langdok - Лангдок (Macedonian), Languedoc (Afrikaans, Danish, Dutch, Estonian, Finnish, French, German, Hungarian, Romanian, Spanish, Swedish, Turkish), Languedoque (Portuguese), Lengouadoc (Arpitan), Langwedocja (Polish), Lengadòc (Occitan), Lenguadoc (Old Spanish), Linguadoca (Italian), Llenguadoc (Catalan), Llinguadoc (Leonese), Occitania (Latin)
Lapland	Finnmark (Norwegian), Lapimaa (Estonian), an Laplainn (Irish), Lapland (Afrikaans, Danish, Dutch), Laponia (Latin, Polish, Romanian, Spanish), Lapònia (Catalan), Lapónia (Portuguese), Lapônia (Brazilian Portuguese), Laponie (French), Laponija - Лапонија (Macedonian, Serbian), Laponsko (Czech), Laponya (Turkish), Lappföld (Hungarian), Lappi (Finnish), Lappland or Sámaland (Faroese), Lappland (German, Swedish), Lapponia (Italian), Lapponja (Maltese), Llaponia (Leonese), Sápmi (Sami)
Laponia (Finland and Sweden)	Finnmark (Norwegian, older Swedish), Lapimaa (Estonian), Lapland (Afrikaans, Danish, Dutch), Lapònia (Catalan), Laponia (Albanian, Latin, Polish, Romanian, Spanish), Lapónia (Portuguese), Lapônia (Brazilian Portuguese), Laponie (French), Laponija (Serbian), Laponija - Лапонија / Lapland - Лапланд (Macedonian), Laponska (Slovene), Laponsko (Czech), Laponya (Turkish), Lappföld (Hungarian), Lappi (Finnish), Lappland (Faroese, German, Swedish), Lapponia (Italian), Lapponja (Maltese), Sápmi (Sami)
Latgalia	Latgale (Estonian, French, Irish, Latvian), Latgália (Portuguese), Latgàlia (Catalan variant), Łatgalia (Polish), Latgale / Latgalya (Turkish), Latgalija - Латгалија / Latgale - Латгале (Macedonian), Latgallia (variant in English, Finnish), Letgàlia (Catalan), Letgallen (Danish), Lettgallen (Swedish), Letgallia (Italian)
Latium	Laci (Catalan), Lacij (Croatian), Lácio (Portuguese), Lacio (Albanian, Spanish), Lacio - Лацио (Macedonian), Lacion (Arpitan), Lacjum (Polish), Latium (Afrikaans, Danish, Dutch, French, German, Hungarian, Latin, variant in Romanian), Lazio (Estonian, Italian, Romanian, variant in English, Turkish), Lazio or Latina (Finnish), Lazjo (Maltese)
León	Leão (Portuguese), Legio (Latin), Leon (Maltese, Polish, Romanian), León (Danish, Estonian, French, Finnish, Hungarian, Irish, Spanish, Turkish), Leon - Леон (Macedonian), Lleó (Catalan), Lleón (Asturian), Llión (Leonese), Lion (Arpitan)
Lesser Poland	Aşağı Polonya / Küçük Polonya (Turkish), Kis-Lengyelország (Hungarian), Kleinpolen (German), Klein-Polen (Dutch), Lillepolen (Danish), Little Poland (variant in English), Mala Polska - Мала Полска (Macedonian), Małopolska (Polish), Malopolsko (Czech), Pequena Polónia (Portuguese), Pequena Polônia (Brazilian Portuguese), Pequeña Polonia (Spanish), Petita Polònia (Catalan), Petite-Pologne (French), Piccola Polonia (Italian), an Pholainn Bheag (Irish), Polonia Mică (Romanian), Polonia Minor (Latin), Polonja Minuri (Maltese), Vähä-Puola (Finnish), Väike-Poola (Estonian)
Liguria	Liguria (Albanian, Arpitan, Italian, Finnish, Hungarian, Latin, Polish, Romanian, Spanish), Ligúria (Catalan, Portuguese), Ligurië (Afrikaans, Dutch), Ligurie (French), Ligurien (German, Swedish), Ligurija (Croatian, Slovene), Ligurija - Лигурија (Macedonian), Ligurja (Maltese), Ligursko (Czech), Ligurya (Turkish), Liguuria (Estonian), Lliguria (Leonese)
Limburg	Limbourg (French), Limburch (Frisian), Limburg (Afrikaans, Danish, Dutch, Estonian, Finnish, German, Hungarian, Irish, Romanian, Serbian, Swedish, Turkish), Limburg - Лимбург (Macedonian), Limburgia (Polish), Limburgo (Italian, Portuguese, Spanish), Limburgum (Latin)
Limousin	Lemosin (Occitan), Lemosín (Spanish), Limosino (Italian), Limosin (Arpitan), Limousin (Afrikaans, Danish, Dutch, Estonian, Finnish, French, German, Hungarian, Polish, Romanian, Swedish, Turkish), Limusino or Limousin (Portuguese), Limuzen - Лимузен (Macedonian), Llemosí (Catalan)
Livonia	Inflantia (variant in English and Polish), Inflanty (Polish), Liivimaa (Estonian), Liivinmaa (Finnish), Liflândiâ - Лифляндия (Russian), Lijfland (Dutch), an Liovóin (Irish), Livland (Danish, German, Swedish), Livonia (Albanian, Italian, Latin, Romanian, Spanish), Livònia (Catalan), Livónia (Hungarian), Livónia (Portuguese), Livônia (Brazilian Portuguese), Livonie (French), Livonija (Latvian), Livonija - Ливонија (Macedonian), Livonja (Maltese), Livonsko (Czech), Livonya (Turkish), Liwonia (former Polish variant), Llivoña (Leonese), Lyfland (Afrikaans)
Lombardy	Langbarðaland (Icelandic), Langobardia (Latin), Llombardia (Catalan), an Lombaird (Irish), Lombardei (German), Lombardia (Albanian, Arpitan, Estonian, Finnish, Hungarian, Italian, Polish, Portuguese, Romanian, Slovak), Lombardía (Spanish), Lombardie (French, Czech), Lombardiet (Danish, Swedish), Lombardija (Croatian, Maltese, Slovene), Lombardija - Ломбардија (Macedonian, Serbian), Lombardije (Dutch), Lombardiya (Turkish), Lombardye (Afrikaans)
Lorraine	An Lorráin (Irish), Hloðeringa (Old English), Latarynhija - Латарынгія (Belarusian), Llorena (Leonese), Loataringen (Western Frisian), Lorain - ਲੋਰੈਨ (Punjabi), Loren (Breton, Turkish, Zazaki), Loren - Лорен or Lorena - Лорена (Macedonian), Lorén - אלזס (Hebrew), Lorên - لورن (Persian), Loren - लोरेन (Hindi, Marathi), Loren-a (Piedmontese), Lorena (Albanian, Aragonese, Asturian, Bosnia, Catalan, Croatian, Galician, Interlingua, Lombard, Maltese, Occitan, Portuguese, Romanian, Sardinian, Slovenian, Spanish, Venetian), Lorena - Лорена, Lotargija - Лотаргија, Lotaringija - Лотарингија or Lotringen - Лотринген (Serbian), Lorena or Loreno (Italian), Loreni - ლორენი or Lotaringia - ლოთარინგია (Georgian), Loreno (Esperanto), Lorraine or Lothringen (Danish, Finnish, Swedish), Lorraine or Lotring (Estonian), Lorraíni - Λωρραίνη (Greek), Lorreinen or Lotharingen (Dutch), Lorrena (Basque), Lorrêna (Arpitan), Lot'aringia - Լոթարինգիա (Armenian), Lotaringe (Afrikaans), Lotaringia (Hungarian), Lotaringija (Lithuania, Talysh), Lotaríngija - Лотари́нгия (Russian), Lotaringija - Лотарингия or Lotaríngija - Лотари́нгия (Bulgarian), Lotaringiya (Azerbaijani), Lotaringiya - Лотарингия (Uzbek), Lotaringye - לאָטאַרינגיע (Yiddish), Lotaryngia (Polish), Lotarynhija - Лотарингія (Ukrainian), Lotharingia (Latin), Lothréngen or Lothringen (Moselle Franconian), Lothringe (Alemannic, Palatine German), Lothringe or Lotthringe (Rhine Franconian), Lothringen (German, Northern Sami), Lothringska (Lower Sorbian, Upper Sorbian), Lotréngen or Loutréngen (Luxembourgish Platt), Lotringa (Kashubian, Latvian), Lotringia (Ido), Lotrinsko (Czech, Slovak), Loûerëne, Louréne or Lourène (Lorrain roman), Loutrengen (Luxemburgish), Lɔɔ-rɛɛn - ลอแรน (Thai), Luòlín - 洛林 (Mandarin), Lurena (Sicilian), Lūryyin - لُورْيِّن (Arabic), Roren - 로렌 (Korean), Rorēnu - ロレーヌ (Japanese)
Lower Austria	Ala-Itävalta (Finnish), Alam-Austria (Estonian), Alsó-Ausztria (Hungarian), Aşağı Avusturya (Turkish), Austria e Poshtme (Albanian), Austria Inferioară or Austria de Jos (Romanian), Austria Inferior (Latin), Awstrija ta' Isfel (Maltese), Baixa Áustria (Portuguese), Baixa Àustria (Catalan), Baja Austria (Spanish), Bassa Austria (Italian), Basse-Autriche (French), Dolna Austria (Polish), Dolna Avstrija - Долна Австрија (Macedonian), Dolní Rakousy (Czech), Donja Austrija (Croatian), Neder-Oostenrijk (Dutch), Neder-Oostenryk (Afrikaans), Niederösterreich (Danish, German, Swedish), an Ostair Íochtarach (Irish), Spodnja Avstrija (Slovene), Žemutinė Austrija (Lithuanian)
Lower Saxony	Ala-Saksi (Finnish) Alam-Saksi (Estonian), Alsó-Szászország (Hungarian), Aşağı Saksonya (Turkish), Baja Sajonia (Spanish), Bassa Sassonia (Italian), Baixa Saxònia (Catalan), Baixa Saxónia (Portuguese), Baixa Saxônia (Brazilian Portuguese), Baixo Saxe (Portuguese variant), Basse-Saxe (French), Dolna Saksonia (Polish), Dolna Saksonija - Долна Саксонија (Macedonian), Dolní Sasko (Czech), Donja Saksonija (Bosnian, Serbian), Donja Saska (Croatian), Neddersassen (Low Saxon), Nedersaksen (Dutch, Frisian), Neder-Sakse (Afrikaans), Niedersachsen (Danish, German, Norwegian, Swedish), Saksonia e Poshtme (Albanian), Sassonja ta' Isfel (Maltese), Saxonia Inferioară or Saxonia de Jos (Romanian), Saxonia Inferior (Latin), Spodnja Saška (Slovene) Neðra-Saxland (Icelandic), an tSacsain Íochtarach (Irish)

== M ==
English name	Other names or former names
Macedonia	Macédoine (French), Macedonia (Italian, Latin, Polish, Romanian, Spanish, Welsh), Macedònia (Catalan), Macedónia (Hungarian (for country), Portuguese), Macedônia (Portuguese), Macedonië (Dutch), Maċedonja (Maltese), Macedónsko (Slovak), Makedonia (Finnish), Makedonía - Μακεδονία (Greek), Makedónia (Faroese, Hungarian [for Greek region]), Makedonie (Czech), Makedonien (Danish, Swedish, German [referring to ancient Macedonia]), Maķedonija (Latvian), Makedonija (Lithuanian, Slovene), Makedonija - Македонија (Macedonian, Serbian), Makedonya (Turkish), Makedoonia (Estonian), Maqedonia (Albanian), Mazedonien (German), an Mhacadóin (Irish)
Mačva	Mačva - Мачва (Macedonian, Serbian), Mačva / Maçva (Turkish), Macsó (Hungarian)
Maramureş	Maramureş (Romanian, Turkish), Maramureš - Марамуреш (Macedonian), Máramaros (Hungarian), Maramures (Estonian), Marmatie (French), Marmarosz (Polish)
Marches	Las Marcas (Spanish), Marcas (Portuguese), Marchia (Latin), Marche (Danish, Dutch, Estonian, Italian, Polish, Romanian, Swedish, Turkish), Marches (French), Marke (Albanian, Maltese), Marke - Марке (Macedonian), Marken (Dutch variant, German), Mârques (Arpitan), les Marques (Catalan)
Masovia	Masoovia (Estonian), Masovia (Italian, Finnish), Masovia / Mazovia (Latin), Masóvia / Mazóvia (Portuguese), Masòvia (Catalan), Masovien (Swedish), Masowien (German), Mazóvia (Hungarian), Mazovia (Romanian, Spanish, variant in English), Mazovie (French), Mazovija (Lithuanian), Mazovija - Мазовија / Mazovše - Мазовше (Macedonian), Mazovijsko (Slovenian), Mazovjecko (Croatian), Mazovsko (Czech, Slovak), Mazovya (Turkish), Mazowsze (Polish), an Mhasóiv (Irish)
Masuria	Masuren or Masurenland (German), Masuria (Italian, Latin, Finnish), Masúria / Mazúria (Catalan, Portuguese), Masurien (Swedish), Masuuria (Estonian), Mazuria (Hungarian, Romanian), Mazurië (Dutch), Mazurie (French), Mazurija - Мазурија (Macedonian), Mozūrija (Lithuanian), Mazury (Polish), Mazurya (Turkish)
Mecklenburg	Mecklembourg (French), Mecklemburgo (Portuguese variant, Spanish), Mecklenburg (Afrikaans, Croatian, Danish, Dutch, Estonian, Finnish, German, Hungarian, Norwegian, Romanian, Slovene, Swedish, Turkish), Mecklenbursko (Slovak), Meclemburgo (Portuguese), Meclenburgo (Italian), Megapolis (Latin), Mekelborg (Low Saxon), Meklemburgia (Polish), Meklenburch (Frisian), Meklenburg - Мекленбург (Macedonian), Meklenburgo (Esperanto), Meklenbursko (Czech)
Mecklenburg-Vorpommern	Mecklembourg-Poméranie antérieure or Mecklembourg-Poméranie-Occidentale (French), Mecklemburgo-Pomerânia Anterior or Mecklemburgo-Pomerânia Ocidental or Meclemburgo-Pomerânia Ocidental (Portuguese), Mecklemburgo-Pomerania Anterior (Spanish), Mecklenburg-Voorpommeren (Afrikaans), Mecklenburg-Voorpommeren or Mecklenburg-Voor-Pommeren (Dutch), Mecklenburg-Elő-Pomeránia (Hungarian), Mecklenburg-Hither Pomerania (variant in English), Mecklenburg-Pomerania Inferioară (or Anterioară) (Romanian), Mecklenburg-Pomorjansko (Slovene), Mecklenburg-Vorpommern (Croatian, Danish, Estonian, German, Norwegian, Swedish, Turkish), Mecklenburg-Voorpommeren (Dutch), Meclenburgo-Pomerania Anteriore (Italian), Mecklenbursko-Predpomoransko (Slovak), Mekelborg-Vörpommern (Low Saxon), Meklemburgia-Pomorze Przednie (Polish), Meklenburch-Foarpommeren (Frisian), Meklenburg-Zapadna Pomeranija - Мекленбург-Западна Померанија / Meklenburg-Predna Pomeranija - Мекленбург-Предна Померанија(Macedonian), Meklenburgo-Antaŭpomerio (Esperanto), Meklenbursko-Přední Pomořansko (Czech), Mecklenburg-Etu-Pommeri (Finnish)
Medelpad	Medelpad (Estonian, French, Italian, Portuguese, Swedish, Turkish), Medelpad - Меделпад(Macedonian), Medelpadia (Latin)
Metohija	Dukagjini (Albanian), Métochie (French), Metochien (German), Metohia (Romanian, variant in English), Metohija (Estonian), Metohija - Метохија (Macedonian, Serbian), Metohiya / Dukakin (Turkish), Metòkhia / Metòquia (Catalan), Metóquia (Portuguese)
Moldavia	Boğdan (former Turkish), an Mholdáiv (Irish), Moldaavia (Estonian alternate), Moldau (German), Moldavia (Albanian, Basque, Italian, Latin, Spanish), Moldàvia (Catalan), Moldávia (Portuguese), Moldavië (Dutch), Moldavie (French), Moldavien (Danish, Swedish), Moldavija (Croatian, Lithuanian, Slovene), Moldavija - Молдавија (Macedonian, Serbian), Moldavja (Maltese), Moldavsko (Czech, Slovak), Moldova (Turkish), Mołdawia (Polish), Moldhavía - Μολδαβία (Greek), Moldova (Estonian, Finnish, Romanian, variant in Swedish), Moldva (Hungarian), Mordavéye (Arpitan)
Montferrat	Monferat - Монферат (Macedonian), Monferrat (Maltese), Monferrato (Italian, Polish, Spanish, Turkish), Monfrà (Piedmontese), Montferrat (Catalan, Dutch, Finnish, French, German, Hungarian, Portuguese, Romanian, Swedish)
Moravia	Määri (Finnish), Määrimaa (Estonian alternate), Mæhren (Danish), Mähren (German, Norwegian, Swedish, variant in Danish), an Mhoráiv (Irish), Moraavia (Estonian alternate), Morava (Czech, Estonian, Slovak), Moravia (Albanian, Italian, Latin, Romanian, Spanish), Morávia (Portuguese), Moràvia (Catalan), Moravië (Dutch), Moravie (French), Moravija - Моравија (Macedonian), Moravija - Моравия (Russian), Moravja (Maltese), Moravya (Turkish), Morawy (Polish), Morvaország (Hungarian), Moravska (Croatian, Slovene)
Moravian Slovakia	Eslováquia Morava (Portuguese), Mährische Slowakei (German), Mähriska Slovakien (Swedish), Moravska Slovačka (Serbian), Moravs'ka Slovaččyna - Моравська Словаччина (Ukrainian), Moravskaja Slovakija - Моравская Словакия (Russian), Moravské Slovensko (variant in Czech), Morawska Słowacja (Polish), Slovácko (Czech, Slovak), Slovak Moravyası (Turkish), Slovac'ko - Словацько (variant Ukrainian), an tSlóvaic Morávach (Irish)
Moravian Wallachia	Eflak Moravyası (Turkish), Mährische Walachei (German), Moravs'ka Vološčyna - Моравська Волощина (Ukrainian), Moravskaja Valachija - Моравская Валахия (Russian), Moravské Valašsko (variant in Czech and in Slovak), Morawska Wołoszczyzna (Polish), Valacchia morava (Italian), an Valáic Morávach (Irish), Valáquia Morava (Portuguese), Valaquie morave (French), Valašsko (Czech, Slovak), Vlahia moravă (Romanian), Vološs'ko - Волошсько (variant Ukrainian)

== N ==
English name	Other names or former names
Navarre	Nabarra (popular variant in Basque), Nafarroa (official Basque), Navara - Навара (Macedonian), Navara (Albanian), Navarra (Arpitan, Catalan, Croatian, Danish, Dutch, Estonian, Finnish, Gascon, German, Hungarian, Irish, Italian, Maltese, Portuguese, Romanian, Slovene, Spanish, Swedish, Czech, Turkish), Navarre (French), Nawarra (Polish)
Närke	Närke (Estonian, Swedish, Turkish), Nericia (Latin), Nerícia (Portuguese, rare), Néricie (French), Nerike (oldert variant in Swedish), Nerke - Нерке (Macedonian)
Nidwalden	Nidvaldo (Italian), Nidwald (French), Nidvalden - Нидвалден (Macedonian), Nidwalden (Danish, Estonian, German, Swedish, Turkish), Sutsilvania (Romansh)
Normandy	an Normainn (Irish), Normandí (Icelandic), Normandia (Albanian, Catalan, Estonian, Finnish, Hungarian, Italian, Polish, Portuguese, Romanian), Normandía (Spanish), Normandië (Dutch), Normandie (Czech, French, German), Normandiet (Danish, Swedish), Normandija (Croatian, Maltese, Slovene), Normandija - Нормандија (Macedonian), Normandiya (Turkish), Neurmindie (Picard)
North Rhine	Észak-Rajna (Hungarian), Kuzey Ren (Turkish), Nadrenia Północna (Polish), Noardryn (Frisian), Noord-Rijnland (Dutch), Noordryn (Afrikaans), Nord Reno / Renania settentrionale(Italian), Nordrhein (Danish, Estonian, Finnish, German, Low Saxon, Norwegian, Swedish), Põhja-Rein (Estonian alternate), Raini i Veriut (Albanian), Renania del Norte (Spanish), Renania de Nord (Romanian), Renânia do Norte (Portuguese), Rhénanie-du-Nord (French), Severna Rajna - Северна Рајна (Macedonian), Severno Porenje (Slovene), Severní Porýní (Czech), Sjeverno Porajnje (Croatian), Tuaisceart na Réine (Irish)
North Rhine-Westphalia	Észak-Rajna-Vesztfália (Hungarian), Nadrenia Północna-Westfalia (Polish), Noardryn-Westfalen (Frisian), Kuzey Ren-Vestfalya (Turkish), Noord-Rijnland-Westfalen or Noordrijn-Westfalen (Dutch), Noordryn-Wesfalen (Afrikaans), Nord Reno-Westfalia / Renania settentrionale-Vestfalia(Italian), Nordrhein-Westfalen (Danish, Estonian, German, Low Saxon, Norwegian, Swedish), Põhja-Rein-Vestfaal (Estonian alternate), Raini i Veriut dhe Falia Perëndimore (Albanian), Renania del Norte-Westfalia (Spanish), Renania de Nord-Westfalia (Romanian), Renânia do Norte-Vestfália (Portuguese), Rhénanie-du-Nord-Westphalie (French), Rin del Nord - Westfàlia (Catalan), Severna Rajna-Vestfalija - Северна Рајна-Вестфалија (Macedonian), Severno Porenje-Vestfalija (Slovene), Severní Porýní-Vestfálsko (Czech), Sjeverno Porajnje-Zapadna Falačka (Croatian), Tuaisceart na Réine agus an Viostfáil (Irish)
Northern Ireland	Amihanan nga Irlanda (Waray-Waray), Bắc Ireland (Vietnamese), Báe̤k Ái-ī-làng (Min Dong), Bakurê Îrlandê (Kurdish), Chinchay Ilanda (Quechua), Çурçĕр Ирланди (Chuvash), Èirinn a Tuath (Scottish Gaelic), Észak-Írország (Hungarian), Gogledd Iwerddon (Welsh), Hibernia Septentrionalis (Latin), Ilann dinò (Haitian), Ipar Irlanda (Basque), Ireland Utara (Malay), Írẹ́lándì Apáàríwá (Yoruba), Irlanda d'o Norte (Aragonese), Irlanda dal Nord (Romansh), Irlanda de Nord (Romanian), Irlanda del Nord (Catalan, Interlingua, Italian, Venetian), Irlanda del Nòrd (Occitan, Piedmontese), Irlanda del Norte (Asturian, Spanish, Ilokano), Irlanda del Norti (Extremaduran), Irlanda do Nòrd (Ligurian), Irlanda do Norte (Portuguese, Galician), Irlanda Norte (Tetum), Irlanda ta' Fuq (Maltese), Irlanda Veriore (Albanian), İrlandaya Zımey (Zazaki), Irlande du Nord (French, Norman), Irlandí ya Nola (Lingala), Irlandia Kalér (Sundanese), Irlandia Lor (Javanese), Irlandia Północna (Polish), Irlandia Utara (Indonesian), Irlanna dû Nord (Sicilian), Kahilagaang Irlanda (Tagalog), Kuzey İrlanda (Turkish), Nerin Hwoaie (Manx), Noard-Ierlân (West Frisian), Noord-Ierlaand (Dutch Low Saxon), Noord-Ierland (Afrikaans, Dutch, Zeelandic), Nord-Irland (Norwegian), Nord-Irlando (Esperanto, Ido), Nordirland (Bavarian, Danish, German, Luxembourgish, Swedish), Norður-Írland (Icelandic), Norðurírland (Faroese), Nordutno Irland (Romani), Northern Ireland (Scots), Norzhiwerzhon (Breton), Noten Aialan (Tok Pisin), Pak Éire (Min Nan), Pódpołnocna Irska (Lower Sorbian), Põhja-Iirimaa (Estonian), Pohjois-Irlanti (Finnish), Severna Irska (Slovenian), Severna Irska - Северна Ирска (Macedonian, Serbian), Severné Írsko (Slovak), Severní Irsko (Czech), Sewjerna Irska (Upper Sorbian), Šiaurės Airija (Lithuanian), Şimali İrlandiya (Azerbaijani), Sjeverna Irska (Bosnian, Croatian), Tuaisceart Éireann (Irish), Waqooyiga Ayrland (Somali), Wordhen Gledh (Cornish), Ziemeļīrija (Latvian), Βόρεια Ιρλανδία (Greek), Ар Гәәлгүдин Таңһч (Kalmyk), Ирландияи Шимолӣ (Tajik), Паўночная Ірландыя (Belarusian), Північна Ірландія (Ukrainian), Северна Ирландия (Bulgarian), Северная Ирландия (Russian), Төньяк Ирландия (Tatar), Умард Ирланд (Mongolian), Цӕгат Ирланди (Ossetian), ჩრდილოეთი ირლანდია (Georgian), Հյուսիսային Իռլանդիա (Armenian), צפון אירלאנד (Yiddish), צפון אירלנד (Hebrew), أيرلندا الشمالية (Arabic), اتلا آئرلینڈ (Western Panjabi), ايرلاندا الشماليه (Egyptian Arabic), ایرلند شمالی (Persian), شمالی آئرلینڈ (Urdu),
Northumbria	Norðan-Hymbria (Anglo-Saxon), Norðymbraland (Icelandic), Nortambrija - Нортамбрија (Macedonian, Serbian), Northumbria (Albanian, Dutch, Estonian, Finnish, Hungarian, Latin, Romanian, Spanish, Turkish), Northúmbria (Catalan), Northumbrie (French), Northumbrien (German), Nortumbair (Irish), Nortumbria (Italian, Polish), Nortúmbria (Portuguese)
Nösnerland	Naszód (Hungarian), Năsăud (Romanian alternate), Nesnerland - Неснерланд (Macedonian), Nösnerland (German), Ţara Năsăudului (Romanian)

== O ==
English name	Other names or former names
Obwalden	Obvalden - Обвалден (Macedonian), Obvaldo (Italian), Obwald (French), Obwalden (Dutch, Estonian, German, Swedish, Turkish), Sursilvania (Romansh)
Öland	Eland - Еланд (Macedonian), Elandas (Lithuanian), Oelande (French), Oelandia (Latin), Öland (Estonian, Swedish, Turkish), Øland (Danish), Olandia (Polish), Olândia (Portuguese), Öölanti (Finnish)
Orava	Arva (Latin), Árva (Hungarian), Arwa (German), Orava (Estonian, Romanian, Slovak, Turkish), Orava - Орава (Macedonian), Orawa (Polish)
Ostrobothnia	Bothnia Orientalis or Ostrobothnia (Latin), Botnie-Orientale (French), Österbotten (Swedish), an Ostrabóitne (Irish), Ostrobothnia (Turkish), Ostrobótnia (Portuguese), Ostrobòtnia (Catalan), Ostrobotnija - Остроботнија (Macedonian), Pohjanmaa (Estonian, Finnish)
Östergötland	Esterjetland - Естерјетланд / Ostrogotija - Остроготија (Macedonian), Gothie orientale (French), Östergötland (Estonian, Swedish, Turkish), Ostrogotia (Spanish), Ostrogothia or Gothia Orientalis (Latin), Gotalândia Oriental (Portuguese), Itä-Götanmaa (Finnish)
Overijssel	Oaveriesel (local Dutch Low Saxon dialects [Sallands and Twents]), Oerisel (Frisian), Overejsel - Оверејсел (Macedonian), Overijssel (Danish, Dutch, Estonian, French, German, Swedish, Turkish), Overissel (Portuguese)

== P ==
English name	Other names or former names
Palatinate	Falcko or Falc (Czech), Palatina (Turkish), Palatinado (Portuguese, Spanish), Palatinat (Catalan, French, Maltese, Romanian), Palatinato (Italian), Palatynat (Polish), Palts (Afrikaans, Dutch, Frisian), Palz (Low Saxon), Pfalz (Croatian, Danish, Estonian, German, Hungarian, Norwegian, Slovene, Swedish), Pfalc - Пфалц / Palatinat - Палатинат (Macedonian), an Phalaitíneacht (Irish)
Peloponnese	Mora (Turkish), More (Albanian variant), Morea (older English, older Italian), Moréas - Μωρέας / Moriás - Μωριάς (variants in Greek), Morée (older French), Peloponeso (Portuguese), Peloponeso or Morea (Spanish), Peloponès (Catalan), Peloponez (Albanian, Polish, Romanian, Slovene), Peloponez - Пелопонез (Macedonian, Serbian), Peloponnes (Danish, German), Péloponnèse (French), Peloponneso (Italian), Peloponnesos (Dutch, Estonian, Finnish, Swedish), Peloponnesus (Latin), Peloponnészosz (Hungarian), Peloponneżu (Maltese), Pelopónnisos - Πελοπόννησος (Greek), an Pheilipinéis (Irish)
Picardy	an Phiocaird (Irish), Picårdeye (Walloon), Picardia (Catalan, Finnish, Portuguese, Romanian), Picardía (Spanish), Picardiet (Danish), Picardië (Dutch), Picardie (Estonian, French, Swedish, Turkish, variant in English and German), Piccardia (Italian), Pikkardija (Maltese), Pikardia (Albanian, Estonian alternate, Polish), Pikardie (Czech, German), Pikardien (variant in Swedish), Pikardija (Croatian), Pikardija - Пикардија (Macedonian), Pecardie (Arpitan)
Piedmont	Pedemontium (Latin), Piamonte (Spanish), Piemont (Albanian, Arpitan, Piedmontese, Occitan, Catalan, Czech, German, Hungarian, Polish, Romanian), Piemont - Пиемонт (Macedonian), Piëmont (Dutch), Piémont (French), Piemonte (Danish, Estonian, Finnish, Italian, Portuguese, Swedish), Píodmant (Irish), Pijemont (Croatian), Piyemonte (Turkish), Pjemonte (Maltese)
Podlaskie	Padlyašša - Падляшша (Belarusian), Podlaasia (Estonian), Podlachia (Italian, Latin), Podlachie or Podlaquie (French), Podlachien (German), Podlakya (Turkish), Podláquia (Portuguese), Podlàquia (Portuguese), Podlakja (Maltese), Podlasia (Finnish), Podlasie (Hungarian, Polish), Podlasie - Подласие (Macedonian), Podlasien (Danish, Swedish), Podlasko or Podlasze (older Polish names)
Podolia	Podillya - Поділля (Ukrainian), Podíl·lia (Catalan), Podole (Polish), Podolia (Italian, Romanian, Spanish), Podólia (Hungarian, Portuguese), Podòlia (Catalan variant), Podolië (Dutch), Podolie (French), Podolien (Danish, German, Swedish), Podoliјa - Подолија (Macedonian), Podolja (Maltese), Podolya (Turkish), Podoolia (Estonian)
Poitou	Peitou (Catalan variant), Pictavium (Latin), Poatev (Brezhoneg), Poatu - Поату (Macedonian), Poetou (Poitevin), Poitou (Catalan, Dutch, French, German, Italian, Maltese, Norvegian, Polish, Portuguese, Romanian, Spanish, Swedish, Turkish, Welsh), Pouètô (Arpitan), Puatu (Lithuanian), Puatú - Пуату́ (Russian)
Polesie	Palyes'sye [Palesse] - Палесьсе (Belarusian), Polesia (Finnish, Romanian, Spanish, variant in English), Polésia (Portuguese), Polèsia (Catalan), Polesië (Dutch), Polésie (French), Polesie (Polish), Polesien (Danish, German, Swedish), Polesija - Полесија / Polezija - Полезија (Macedonian), Polesiye / Polezya (Turkish), Polesje (Estonian), Poleszje (Hungarian), Poles'ye - Полесье (Russian), Poliessia (Italian), Poliezia (variant in Romanian), Políssia (Catalan variant), Polissya - Полісся (Ukrainian)
Pomerania	an Phomaráin (Irish), Pomerania (Albanian, Italian, Romanian, Spanish), Pomerania or Pomorania (Latin), Pomerània (Catalan), Pomeránia (Hungarian), Pomerânia (Portuguese), Poméranie (French), Pomeranja (Maltese), Pomeranija - Померанија (Macedonian), Pomeransko (Croatian), Pomeranya (Turkish), Pomerio (Esperanto), Pommeren (Afrikaans, Dutch, Frisian), Pommeri (Finnish), Pommern (Danish, German, Low Saxon, Icelandic, Swedish), Pommeri (Estonian), Pomoransko (Slovak), Pomořansko or Pomořany (Czech), Pomorjansko (Slovene), Pòmòrskô (Kashubian), Pomorze (Polish), Pòmòrze (Pomeranian)
Pomerelia	Pomorze Gdańskie or Pomorze Wschodnie (Polish), Pòrénkòwô Pòmòrskô (Kashubian), Pommerellen (Danish, Dutch, German, Swedish), Kleinpommern (German variant), Pomoří (Czech), Pomérelia (Hungarian), Pomerélia (Portuguese), Pomerelija - Померелија (Macedonian), Pomerellia (Italian, Romanian), Pomerelya (Turkish), Pomérélie or Pomérelie (French), Pomerelia (Spanish, Welsh), Pomerèlia (Catalan), Väike-Pommeri (Estonian)
Prekmurje	Prekmurje (Croatian, Slovene, Turkish), Prekmurje - Прекмурје (Macedonian), Transmuraland (variant in English), Muravidék (Hungarian), Übermurgebiet or Murland (German)
Provence	Probenza (Aragonese), Prouvènço (Provençal), Provänce (Kölsch), Provansa (Croatian, Slovene), Provansa - Прованса (Macedonian, Serbian), Provença (Catalan, Occitan, Portuguese), Provence (Arpitan, Danish, Dutch, Estonian, Finnish, French, German, Hungarian, Romanian, Swedish, Turkish), Provensálsko (Czech), Provenza (Italian, Maltese, Spanish, Asturian, Galego), Provenţa (variant in Romanian), Province (Walloons), Provincia (Latin), Prowansja (Polish), Pruvenza (Sicilian)
Prussia	Borussia or Prussia (Latin), an Phrúis (Irish), Poroszország (Hungarian), Prajzsko (Silesian), Preisi (Estonian alternate), Preisimaa (Estonian), Preußen (German), Preussen (Swiss German, Danish, Swedish), Preussi (Finnish), Prøjsen (older Danish variant), Pruisen (Dutch), Prusia (Albanian, Romanian, Spanish), Prūsija (Lithuanian), Prusija (Croatian, Slovene), Prusija - Прусија (Macedonian, Serbian), Prusko (Czech), Prusse (French), Prûsse (Walloon), Prussia (Italian), Prússia (Catalan, Portuguese), Prussland (Faroese), Prússland (Icelandic), Prussja (Maltese), Prusujo or Prusio (Esperanto), Prusy (Polish), Prusya (Turkish), Prwsia (Welsh)

== R ==
English name	Other names or former names
Rhineland	Dúiche na Réine (Irish), Nadrenia (Polish), Porenje (Slovene), Porýní (Czech), Porýnie (Slovak), Rajna-vidék (Hungarian), Rajnska oblast - Рајнска област (Macedonian), Reinimaa (Estonian), Rejnlando (Esperanto), Renaneye (Walloon), Renània (Catalan), Renania (Italian, Romanian, Spanish), Renanja (Maltese), Renânia (Portuguese), Renanya (Turkish), y Rheindir (Welsh), Rheinland (Croatian, Danish, Estonian alternate, Finnish, German, Low Saxon, Norwegian, Romanian), Rhénanie (French), Rhenlandet (Swedish), Rhinlandet (variant in Danish), Rijnland (Dutch), Rínarlönd (Icelandic), Rynlân (Frisian), Rynland (Afrikaans)
Rhineland-Palatinate	Dúiche na Réine agus an Phalaitíneacht (Irish), Nadrenia-Palatynat (Polish), Porenje-Pfalz (Slovene), Porýní-Falcko (Czech), Rajna-vidék-Pfalz (Hungarian), Rajnska oblast-Pfalc - Рајнска област-Пфалц / Rajnland-Palatinat - Рајнланд-Палатинат (Macedonian), Reinimaa-Pfalz (Estonian alternate), Renaneye-Palatinat (Walloon), Renânia-Palatinado (Portuguese), Renania-Palatinado (Spanish), Renania-Palatinat (Romanian), Renània-Palatinat (Catalan), Renania-Palatinato (Italian), Renanja-Palatinat (Maltese), Renanya-Palatina (Turkish), Rheinland-Palz (Low Saxon), Rheinland-Pfalz (Croatian, Danish, Estonian, German, Norwegian, Romanian, Swedish), Rhénanie-Palatinat (French), Rijnland-Palts (Dutch), Rynlân-Palts (Frisian), Rynland-Palts (Afrikaans)
Rhodes	Rhodes (French), Rhodos (Czech, Danish, Dutch, Estonian, German, Slovak, Swedish), Rhodus (Latin), Rod (Croatian), Rodas (Galician, Spanish), Ródas (Irish), Rodes (Catalan, Portuguese), Rodi (Italian, Maltese), Rodos (Albanian, Dutch variant, Finnish, Polish, Romanian, Slovene, Turkish), Rodos - Родос (Macedonian, Serbian), Ródhos (Greek), Ródosz (Hungarian)
Romagna	Romagna (Danish, Dutch, Estonian, Finnish, German, Hungarian, Irish, Italian, Romanian, Swedish, Turkish), Romagne (French), Romaña (Spanish), Romanha (Portuguese), Romanya (Catalan, Turkish alternate), Romania (Polish, Latin), Romanja (Maltese), Romanja - Ромања (Macedonian)
Roussillon	Rosellón (Spanish), Rosselló (Catalan), Rossiglione (Italian), Rossilhão (Portuguese), Roussillon (Danish, Dutch, Estonian, Finnish, French, German, Hungarian, Maltese, Romanian, Swedish, Turkish), Rosselyon (Arpitan), Rusijon - Русијон (Macedonian)
Ruhr district	Ruhr bölgesi (Turkish), Ruhr district (English), Ruhrgebiet (German), Ruhrområdet (Swedish), Rur - Рур (Macedonian)
Rumelia	Rumeli (Turkish), Rumelija (Bosnian, Croatian, Slovene), Rumelija - Румелија (Serbian, Macedonian), Rumeliya - Румелия (Bulgarian), Rumelia (Albanian, Finnish, Italian, Norwegian, Polish, Romanian, Spanish), Rumèlia (Catalan), Rumélia (Hungarian, Portuguese), Rumelja (Maltese), Rumelien (Danish, German, Swedish), Roumélie (French), Roemelië (Dutch, Afrikaans), Roúmeli - Ρούμελη or Romylía - Ρωμυλία (Greek)
Ruthenia	Rus' - Русь (Russian, Ukrainian), an Rúitéin (Irish), Ruś (Polish), Rus (Czech, Slovak, Swedish), Ruteenia (variant in Estonian), Rutenia (Finnish, Italian, Norwegian, Romanian, Spanish), Rutenja (Maltese), Rutènia (Catalan), Ruténia (Hungarian, Portuguese), Rutênia (Brazilian Portuguese), Rutenija (Croatian), Rutenija - Рутенија (Macedonian), Rutenya (Turkish), Ruthenia (Latin), Ruthénie (French), Ruthenien (Danish, German, Swedish), Vene (Estonian)

== S ==
English name	Other names or former names
Saaremaa	Øsel (Danish), Ösel (German, Swedish), Ozylia (former Polish), Saare (Estonian alternate), Saaremaa (Dutch, Estonian, Hungarian, Turkish), Saarenmaa (Finnish), Sāmsala (Latvian), Sarema (Lithuanian, Polish), Sarema - Сарема (Macedonian)
Saarland	Posarje (Slovene), Saar (Finnish, variant in Romanian), Saara (Polish), Saarimaa (Estonian), Saarlân (Frisian), Saarland (Afrikaans, Croatian, Danish, Dutch, German, Icelandic, Italian, Low Saxon, Norwegian, Romanian, Swedish, Turkish), Saar-vidék (Hungarian), Sar - Сар (Macedonian, Serbian), Sarlanda (Albanian), Sarre (French, Portuguese, Spanish), Sársko (Czech), an tSárlainn (Irish)
Samland	Sambia (Finnish, Irish, Latin, Polish), Sambie (French), Sambija (Estonian), Samland (Danish, German, Hungarian, Romanian, Swedish, Turkish), Semlyand (Russian), Zemlandski Poluostrov - Земландски Полуостров / Sambija - Самбија (Macedonian)
Samogitia	Samogícia (Portuguese), Samogitia (Irish, Latin), Samogítia (Catalan), Samogitië (Dutch), Samogitie (French), Samogitien (Danish, German, Swedish), Samogitija - Самогитија (Macedonian), Samogitya (Turkish), Samogizia (Italian), Schamaiten (German), Žemaitija (Estonian, Finnish, Lithuanian), Żmudź (Polish)
Samos	Samas (Irish), Sámos (Estonian), Samos - Самос (Macedonian), Sisam (Turkish)
Sandžak	Sandžak (Bosnian), Sandžak - Санџак (Macedonian, Serbian), Sancak (Turkish), Sandjak (Danish, Dutch, French), Sandschak (German), Sandżak (Polish), Sangeac (Romanian), Sangiaccato (Italian); Sandschak von Novi Pazar (former German name), Sangiaccato di Novipazar (former Italian name), Sanjaco (Portuguese), Sanxhaku (Albanian), Szandzsák (Hungarian)
Sardinia	Cerdeña (Spanish), Ichnusa (Phoenician), Sandalyon or Sardo (Classical Greek), Sardaigne (French), Sardegna (Italian), Sardègne (Arpitan), Sardenha (Portuguese), Sardenja (Albanian, Maltese), Sardenya (Catalan), Sardigna/Sardinna/Sardinnia (Sardinian), Sardiinia (Estonian), Sardinia (Finnish, Latin, Romanian), Sardínia (Slovak), Sardínie (Czech), Sardinië (Dutch), Sardinien (Danish, German, Swedish), Sardinija (Croatian, Slovene), Sardinija - Сардинија (Macedonian, Serbian), Sardinya (Turkish), Sardynia (Polish), Szardínia (Hungarian), an tSairdín (Irish)
Satakunta	Satakunda (Swedish), Satakunta (Estonian, Finnish, French, Irish, Turkish), Satakunta - Сатакунта (Macedonian), Finlandia Septentrionalis (Latin)
Savonia	Savo (Estonian, Finnish), Savolax (Swedish), Savolaks (Danish), Savonia (Albanian, Latin, Romanian), Savónia (Portuguese), Savònia (Catalan), Savônia (Brazilian Portuguese), Savonie (French), Savonija - Савонија (Macedonian), Savonya (Turkish), an tSabhóin (Irish)
Savoy	Sabaudia (Polish), Sabaudia or Sapaudia (Latin), Savouè (Arpitan, Savoyard) Saboia (Portuguese), Saboya (Spanish), Saváí (Irish), Savoia or Savoja (Italian, Maltese), Savoia (Catalan, Estonian, Romanian), Savoie (Dutch, French, Turkish), Savoiji (Finnish), Savoj (Serbian), Savoja (Albanian, Croatian), Savoja - Савоја (Macedonian), Savojen (Swedish), Savojo (Esperanto), Savojsko (Czech, Slovak), Savooien (variant in Dutch), Szavoja (Hungarian), Savoy (Turkish alternate), Savoyen (Danish, German)
Saxony	Sachsen (Danish, Estonian alternate, German, Norwegian, Swedish), Sacse (Walloon), Sajonia (Spanish), Saksen (Afrikaans, Dutch, Frisian, variant in Danish and Norwegian), Saksi (Estonian alternate, Finnish), Saksimaa (Estonian), Saksonia (Albanian, Polish), Saksonija (Bosnian, Lithuanian), Saksonija - Саксонија (Macedonian, Serbian), Saksonya (Turkish), Saska (Croatian), Saška (Slovene), Sasko (Czech, Slovak), Sassen (Low Saxon), Sassonia (Italian), Sassonja (Maltese), Saxe (French), Saxe or Saxónia (Portuguese), Saxland (Icelandic), Saxonia (Latin, Romanian), Saxònia (Catalan), Saxônia (Brazilian Portuguese), Szászország (Hungarian), an tSacsain / an Allshacsain (Irish)
Saxony-Anhalt	Sachsen-Anhalt (German, Danish, Estonian alternate, Norwegian, Swedish, Croatian), Sajonia-Anhalt (Spanish), Saksen-Anhalt (Dutch, Frisian), Saksen-Anholt (Afrikaans), Saksi-Anhalt (Estonian, Finnish), Saksonia-Anhalt (Albanian, Polish), Saksonija-Anhalt - Саксонија-Анхалт (Macedonian), Saksonya-Anhalt (Turkish), Saška-Anhalt (Slovene), Sasko-Anhaltsko (Czech), Sassen-Anhalt (Low Saxon), Sassonia-Anhalt (Italian), Sassonja-Anhalt (Maltese), Saxe-Anhalt (French), Saxónia-Anhalt (Portuguese), Saxonia-Anhalt (Romanian), Saxônia-Anhalt (Brazilian Portuguese), Szász-Anhalt (Hungarian), an tSacsain-Anhalt (Irish)
Scania	Escania (Spanish), Escània (Catalan), Escânia (Portuguese), Scania (English, Italian, Latin, Romanian), Scanie (French), Schonen (German), Skåne (Czech, Danish, Estonian, Norwegian, Slovak, Swedish, Turkish), Skáni (Faroese), Skania (Albanian, Polish), Skanija - Сканија / Skone - Сконе (Macedonian), Skanio (Esperanto), Skánn (Icelandic), Skoone (Finnish)
Schleswig	Eslésvico (Portuguese variant), Schleswig (German, Croatian, Estonian, Finnish, French, Hungarian, Irish, Italian, Norwegian, Portuguese variant, Romanian, Slovene, Spanish, Swedish, Turkish), Šlesvicko (Czech), Sleeswijk (Dutch), Sleeswyk (Afrikaans, Frisian), Slesvig (Catalan, Danish, variant in Swedish), Slesvik (variant in Norwegian), Slésvík (Icelandic) Šlezvig - Шлезвиг (Macedonian, Serbian), Szlezwik (Polish)
Schleswig-Holstein	Eslésvico-Holsácia (Portuguese variant), Schleswig-Holstein (German, Croatian, Danish variant, Estonian, Finnish, French, Hungarian, Irish, Italian, Norwegian, Portuguese variant, Romanian, Slovene, Spanish, Swedish, Turkish), Šlesvicko-Holštýnsko (Czech), Sleeswijk-Holstein (Dutch), Sleeswyk-Holstein (Afrikaans, Frisian), Slesvig-Holstein (variant in Swedish), Sleswig-Holsteen (Low Saxon), Slesvig-Holsten (Danish), Slesvig-Holstein (Catalan), Šlezvig-Holštajn - Шлезвиг-Холштајн (Macedonian, Serbian), Szlezwik-Holsztyn (Polish), Slésvík-Holtsetaland (Icelandic)
Schwyz	Schwyz (German, Dutch, Estonian, Hungarian, Romanian, Turkish), Schwytz (French, Finnish), Svitto (Italian), Sviz (Romansh), Švic - Швиц (Macedonian), Sieviche (Arpitan)
Scotland	Alba (Scottish Gaelic), Albain (Irish), Alban (Cornish), Albania (Latin variant), Bro-Skos (Breton), Caledonia (Latin variant), Écosse (French), Êcosse (Norman), Ekòs (Haitian Creole), Ekósi (Lingala), Escocia (Aragonese, Asturian, Galician, Spanish, Waray-Waray), Escócia (Extremaduran, Portuguese), Escòcia (Catalan, Occitan), Escôsse (Walloon), Escotlālpan (Nahuatl), Eskosya (Tagalog), Eskozia (Basque), IsiKotilandi (Zulu), İskoçya (Turkish), Iskusya (Quechua), Koterana (Maori), Nalbin (Manx), Schotlaand (Dutch Low Saxon), Schotland (Dutch), Schottland (Alemannic, Austro-Bavarian, German, Low German, Luxembourgish), Scossia (Ligurian), Scòssia (Piedmontese), Scotia (Interlingua, Latin), Scoția (Romanian), Scotland (Anglo-Saxon, Malay, Scots, Vietnamese, Yoruba), Scotlandia (Aromanian), Scot-tē (Min Nan), Scozia (Italian, Lombard, Romantsch, Venetian), Scozzia (Sicilian), Skozja (Maltese), Seukoteullaendeu - 스코틀랜드 (Korean), Shatlandyya - Шатландыя (Belarusian), Shatlyandyya - Шатляндыя (Belarusian variant), Shkotska - Шкотска (Macedonian, Serbian), Shotland - Шотланд (Mongolian), Shotlandi - Шотланди (Chuvash, Ossetian), Shotlandiya - Шотландия (Bulgarian, Karachay-Balkar, Russian, Tajik, Tatar), Shotlandiya - Шотландія (Ukrainian), Shotlandiye (Uyghur), Sikoshilandi (Swazi) Sjotland (Limburgish), Skocia (Albanian), Skócia (Hungarian), Skotän (Volapük), Skotia (Ido, Novial), Skotía - Σκωτία (Greek), Skotishin Tangghch - Скотишин Таңһч (Kalmyk), Skotija (Latvian), Škotija (Lithuanian), Skotlan (Tok Pisin), Skotlân (Frisian), Skotland (Afrikaans, Danish, Faroese, Icelandic, Kurdish), Skotlandia (Indonesian, Javanese, Sundanese), Skotlando (Esperanto), Skotlanti (Finnish), Skotlund (Pitcairn Creole), Škotska (Bosnian, Croatian, Slovenian), Škotska - Шкотска (Macedonian, Serbian), Skotsko (Czech), Škótsko (Slovak), Skottland (Norwegian, Swedish), Škuotėjė (Samogitian), Sotimaa (Võro), Šotimaa (Estonian), Šotiska (Lower Sorbian, Upper Sorbian), Şotlandiya (Azerbaijani), Sūgélán - 蘇格蘭 (Mandarin Chinese), Sû-kak-làn (Hakka Chinese), Sukottorando - スコットランド (Japanese), Szkocja (Polish), Szkòckô (Kashubian), Szkocyjo (Silesian), Uskoti (Swahili), Yr Alban (Welsh)
Selonia	Felföld (Hungarian), Selija (Estonian, Latvian), Selonia (Finnish, Irish, Italian, Latin, Romanian), Selónia (Portuguese), Selònia (Catalan), Selônia (Brazilian Portuguese), Sélonie (French), Selonija - Селонија (Macedonian), Selonya (Turkish)
Semigalia	Semgallen (Danish, German, Swedish), Semigalia (Polish), Semigália (Portuguese), Semigàlia (Catalan), Semigalya (Turkish), Sémigalle (French), Semigallia (Irish, Italian, variant in English, Finnish alternate), Zemgale (Estonian, Latvian), Zemgale - Земгале (Macedonian), Zemgallia (Finnish), Žiemgala (Lithuanian)
Sicily	Secila (Arpitan), Sicile (French), Sicilia (Italian, Latin, Romanian, Spanish), Siçilia (Albanian), Sicília (Catalan, Portuguese), Sicílie (Czech), Sicilië (Dutch), Sicilien (Danish, Swedish), Sicilija (Croatian, Slovene), Sicilija - Сицилија (Macedonian, Serbian), Sicilya (Turkish), Sikiley (Icelandic), Sisilia (Finnish), Sitsiilia (Estonian), Sizilien (German), Sqallija (Maltese), Sycylia (Polish), Szicília (Hungarian), an tSicil (Irish)
Silesia	Schlesien (Danish, German, Norwegian, Swedish), Sileesia (Estonian), Silesia (Latin, Spanish), Silèsia (Catalan), Silésia (Portuguese), Silésie (French), Silezia (Romanian), Silezië (Dutch), Silezya (Turkish), Śląsk (Polish), Sleesia (Finnish), Slesia (Faroese, Italian), Sleżja (Maltese), Slesien (variant in Danish), Šleska (Croatian), Šlezija (Slovene), Šlezija - Шлезија (Macedonian, Serbian), Slezsko (Czech), Sliezsko (Slovak), Ślonsk or Ślunsk (Silesian), Szilézia (Hungarian), an tSiléis (Irish)
Slavonia	Slavonija (Croatian, Slovene), Slavonija - Славонија (Macedonian, Serbian), Eslavonia (Spanish), Eslavònia (Catalan), Eslavónia (Portuguese), Eslavônia (Brazilian Portuguese), Slavonia (Italian, Latin, Romanian, Finnish), Slavonië (Dutch), Slavonie (Czech, French), Slavonien (Danish, Swedish, variant in German), Slavonja (Maltese), Slavónsko (Slovak), Slavonya (Turkish), Slavoonia (Estonian), Slawonia (Polish), Slawonien (German), Sllavonia (Albanian), Szlavónia (Hungarian), an tSlavóin (Irish)
Småland	Esmolândia (Portuguese, rare), Småland (Danish, Estonian, French, Swedish, Turkish), Smalandia (Latin, Polish), Smálönd (Icelandic), Smoland - Смоланд (Macedonian), Smoolanti (Finnish)
Södermanland	Sedermanland - Седерманланд (Macedonian), Södermanland (Estonian, French, Swedish, Turkish), Södermanlanti (Finnish), Sudermannia (Latin), Sudermânia (Portuguese, rare), Suðurmannaland (Icelandic)
South Tyrol	Südtirol (German, Ladin), Alt Adis (variant in Friulian), Alto Adidže / Alto Adige (Estonian, Italian), Alto Ádige (Portuguese), Alto Adigio / Tirol del Sur (Spanish), Dél-Tirol (Hungarian), Dienvidtirole (Latvian), Etelä-Tiroli (Finnish), Górna Adyga / Południowy Tyrol (Polish), Güney Tirol (Turkish), Haut-Adige / Tyrol du Sud (French), Jižní Tyrolsko (Czech), Jižní Tyroly (variant in Czech), Južen Tirol - Јужен Тирол (Macedonian), Južna Tirolska (Slovene), Južni Tirol (Croatian, Serbian), Lõuna-Tirool (Estonian alternate), Oberetsch (variant in German [once used by Italian government]), Sud Tirôl (Friulian), Alto Adige / Sudtirolo / Sud Tirolo / Tirolo Meridionale / Tirolo del Sud (variants in Italian), Sydtyrol (Danish), Sydtyrolen (Swedish), an Tioróil Theas (Irish), Tirol dal Sid (Romansh), Tirol del Sud (Catalan), Tirol Meridional (Portuguese, rare), Tirolul de Sud (Romanian), Tirolum Meridionale (Latin), Upper Adige (additional variant in English), Zuid-Tirol (Dutch)
Spiš	Scepusium (Latin), Spiš (Czech, Estonian, Slovak, Turkish), Spiš - Спиш (Macedonian), Spisz (Polish), Szepes (Hungarian), Zips (French, German)
Styria	Estiria (Spanish), Estíria (Catalan, Portuguese), Stájerország (Hungarian), Štaerska - Штаерска (Macedonian), Štajerska (Croatian, Slovene), Steiermark (Danish, Dutch, Estonian, Finnish, German, Romanian, Swedish, Turkish), Stiermarken (Dutch), Stiria (Italian), Stirja (Maltese), Štirija (Lithuanian), Styria (Polish, Finnish alternate), Styrie (French), Štýrsko (Czech), Ştiria (variant in Romanian)
Sudetenland	Kraj Sudetów (Polish), pohraniční území (variant in Czech), pohraničné územie (variant in Slovak), Sudetas (Portuguese), Région des Sudètes (French), Sudeettimaa (Finnish), Südet bölgesi (Turkish), Sudetendeutschland, Sudetengebiet, Sudetengebiete (variants in German), Sudetenland (English, Dutch, German, variant in Irish, Norwegian, variant in Swedish), Sudetenland - Судетенланд (variant in Russian, variant in Ukrainian), Sudeterlandet (Danish), Sudeti (Italian), Sudetia (Latin), Sudetio (Esperanto), Sudetlandet (Swedish), Sudetes (Spanish), Sudets (Catalan), Sudetskaja oblast' - Судетская область (Russian), Sudetska oblast - Судетска област (Bulgarian, Macedonian), Sudets'ka oblast' - Судетська область (Ukrainian), Sudetsko (variant in Czech),Sudety (Czech, variant in Polish, Slovak), an Suidéit (variant in Irish), Szudétavidék (Hungarian)
Svalbard	Esvalbarda (Portuguese variant), Oileánra Svalbard (Irish), Huippuvuoret or Spetsbergen (Finnish), Teravmäed (Estonian), Spetsbergen (Swedish), Špicberški ostrovi - Шпицбершки Острови (Macedonian), Spitsbergen (English, Danish, Dutch, Finnish, Norwegian), Spitzbergák (Hungarian), Spitzbergen (German), Svalbard (Albanian, Catalan, Danish, Estonian, French, Italian, Norwegian, Polish, Portuguese variant, Romanian, Slovene, Spanish, Swedish, Turkish, Welsh), Svalbard - Свалбард (Macedonian alternate), Svalbârd (Arpitan), Svalbarð (Faroese, Icelandic), Svalbardo (Esperanto), Szpicbergen (Polish)
Svealand	Sueonia (Latin), Sueónia (Portuguese, rare), Sueônia (Brazilian Portuguese, rare), Svealand (Danish, Estonian, French, Swedish, Turkish), Svealand - Свеаланд (Macedonian), Sveanmaa (Finnish)
Swabia	Schwaben or Schwabenland (German, Danish, Norwegian, Swedish), Souabe (French), Suábia (Portuguese), Suabia (Spanish), Suàbia (Catalan), Suebia (Latin, variant in Romanian), Svaabia (Finnish), Švaabimaa (Estonian), Svábföld (Hungarian), Švabija - Швабија (Macedonian), Švabska (Slovene), Švábsko (Czech, Slovak), Švapska (Croatian, Serbian), Svabya (Turkish), Svevia (Italian), Svevja (Maltese) Szwabia (Polish), Şvabia (Romanian), an tSuáib (Irish), Zwaben (Dutch)
Syrmia	Srem - Срем (Macedonian, Serbian), Srijem (Croatian), Sirem (Turkish), Sirmia (Italian, Spanish), Sírmia (Portuguese), Żmirna (Maltese), Srem (Dutch, Estonian, Romanian), Srem / Syrmia (Polish), Srem - Срем / Srim - Срім / Srym - Срим (Ukrainian), Sriem (Slovak), Srim - Срим (Pannonian Rusyn), Syrmia (Finnish, Latin), Syrmie (French), Syrmien (German), Szerém or Szerémség (Hungarian)
Szeklerland	País sícul (Catalan), País Sículo (Spanish), Pays des Sicules (French), Sekejskij kraj - Секейский край (Russian), Sekelistan (Turkish), Sekelska oblast - Секелска област (Macedonian), Seklerlandet (Swedish), Sikulsko (Czech), Székely Country (English alternate), Székelyföld (Hungarian), Szeklerland (German), Ţinutul Secuiesc (Romanian)

== T ==
English name	Other names or former names
Tavastia	Häme (Estonian, Finnish), Taváscia (Portuguese), Tavastia (Latin), Tavastia / Häme (Turkish), Tavastie (French), Tavastiја - Тавастија (Macedonian), Tavastland (Danish, Swedish), an Thabhastlainn (Irish)
Thessaly	an Teasáil (Irish), Tesalia (Polish, Romanian, Spanish), Tesalija (Croatian), Tesalija - Тесалија (Macedonian, Serbian), Tesalya (Turkish), Tessaalia (Estonian), Tessaglia (Italian), Tessália (Portuguese), Tessàlia (Catalan), Tessalja (Maltese), Tesszália (Hungarian), Thesalia (Albanian), Thessalía - Θεσσαλία (Greek), Thessalië (Dutch), Thessalie (French), Thessalien (Danish, German, Swedish), Thesálie (Czech), Thessalia (Latin, Finnish)
Thrace	Thrace (French), Thracia (Latin), Thracië (Dutch), Thrákie (Czech), Thrakien (Danish, German, Swedish), Traakia (Estonian, Finnish), Tràcia (Catalan), Tracia (Italian, Romanian, Spanish), Trácia (Portuguese), Trácia or Trácko (Slovak), Traċja (Maltese), Tracja (Polish), an Tráicia (Irish), Trakia (Albanian), Trákia (Hungarian), Thráki - Θράκη(Greek),Þrakía (Icelandic), Trakija (Croatian), Trakija - Тракија (Macedonian, Serbian), Trakiya - Тракия (Bulgarian), Trakya (Turkish), Teraqia - תראקיה (Hebrew)
Thurgau	Thurgau (Danish, Dutch, Estonian, German, Hungarian, Swedish, Turkish), Thurgovia (Latin), Thurgovie (French), Turgau - Тургау (Macedonian), Turgovia (Arpitan, Italian, Romanian, Romansh, Spanish), Turgóvia (Portuguese), Turgòvia (Catalan), Turgovja (Maltese)
Thuringia	Durynsko (Czech), Thouringhía - Θουριγγία (Greek), Thuringe (French), Thuringen (Afrikaans), Thüringen (Croatian, Danish, Dutch, Finnish, German, Low Saxon, Norwegian, Swedish), Tiringija - Тирингија (Macedonian, Serbian), an Túrainge (Irish), Turindje (Walloon), Túringen (Frisian), Turíngia (Catalan, Portuguese), Türingia (Hungarian), Turingia (Italian, Romanian, Spanish), Turinġja (Maltese), Turingija (Slovene), Türingiya (Turkish), Turyngia (Polish), Tüüringi (Estonian), Tyringia (Albanian), Þýringaland (Icelandic)
Ticino	Tessin (French, German, Hungarian, Romansh, Swedish), Tesin (Lombard), Tèssin (Arpitan), Ticino (Danish, Dutch, Estonian, Italian, Romanian, Turkish), Tičino - Тичино (Macedonian), Tesino (Spanish)
Touraine	Touraine (Danish, Estonian, Finnish, French, Hungarian, Turkish), Turen - Турен (Macedonian), Turena (Catalan, Spanish), Turenia (Polish, Romanian), Turenna (Italian)
Transcarpathia	Zakarpattia - Закарпаття (Ukrainian), Pudkarpat'ska Rus' - Пудкарпатська Русь (Rusyn), Podkarpatská Rus (Slovak), Kárpátalja (Hungarian), Transcarpatia (Romanian), Zakarpacie (Polish), Podkarpatská Rus (Czech)
Transylvania	Ardeal (variant in Romanian), Chiskarpattya - Чискарпаття (Ukrainian), Erdel (Turkish), Erdelj (archaic Croatian), Erdély (Hungarian), Sedmigradsko - Седмиградско (variant in Bulgarian), Sedmogradska (variant in Croatian), Sedmograška (variant in Slovene), Sedmihradsko (Czech), Sedmogradsko - Седмоградско (variant in Bulgarian), Sedmohradsko (Slovak), Siebenbürgen (German), Siedmiogród (Polish), Transilvaania (Estonian), Transilvaneye (variant in Walloon), Transilvania (Albanian, Finnish, Italian, Romanian, Spanish), Transilvània (Catalan), Transilvânia (Portuguese), Transilvanija (Croatian, Slovene), Transilvanija - Трансилванија (Macedonian, Serbian), Erdelj - Ердељ (archaic Serbian), Transilvanija - Трансилвания (variant in Bulgarian), Transilvaniya (variant in Romani), Transilvanja (Maltese), Transsilvania (Latin), Transsilvanien (variant in Danish and German), Transsylvanien (Danish, Swedish), Transsylvanië (Dutch), Transylvania (variant in mediaeval Latin), Transylvánia (variant in Slovak), Transylvanie (French), Transylvánie (variant in Czech), Transylwania (variant in Polish), Transilvanya (varian in Turkish), Urdul (variant in Turkish), an Trasalváin (Irish), Zevenburgen (variant in Dutch), Zibnbergn - זיבנבערגן (Yiddish), Zivenbork (Walloon)
Trentino	Trentin (Dolomite Ladin, Arpitan, French), Trentino (Albanian, Danish, Estonian, German, Hungarian, Italian, Maltese, Romanian, Spanish, Turkish), Trentino - Трентино (Macedonian), Tridentsko (Czech), Trydent (Polish), Welschtirol (German variant)
Trentino-Alto Adige/Südtirol	Trentin-Adesc Aut / Trentin-Alter Ades / Trentin-Südtirol (Ladin), Trentin Haut Adige (French), Trentino-Alto Adige (Italian), Trentino-Alto Ádige (Portuguese), Trentino-Alto Adige/Südtirol (Turkish), Trentino-Alto Adigio (Spanish), Trentin-Hiôt-Adige (Arpitan), Trentino-Južen Tirol - Трентино-Јужен Тирол (Macedonian), Trentino-Südtirol (German), Trentino-Sudtirolo (variant in Italian), Trentino-South Tyrol (English), Autonome Region Trient-Südtirol (German), Trentino-Tioróil Theas (Irish), Trentino - Tirol del Sud (Catalan)
Tuscany	Toscana (Catalan, Danish, Estonian, Finnish, Italian, Portuguese variant, Romanian, Spanish, Swedish), Toscane (Dutch, French), Toscània (old Catalan), Toscânia (Portuguese variant), Toskana (Albanian, Croatian, German, Maltese, Turkish), Toskana - Тоскана (Macedonian, Serbian), Toskania (Polish), Toskánsko (Czech, Slovak), Toszkána (Hungarian), an Tuscáin (Irish), Tuscia (Latin)
Tyrol	an Tioróil (Irish), Tirol (Catalan, Croatian, Dutch, German, Hungarian, Maltese, Portuguese, Romanian, Spanish, Turkish), Tirol - Тирол (Macedonian, Serbian), Tiroli (Albanian, Finnish), Tirolis (Lithuanian), Tirolo (Italian, Arpitan, Esperanto), Tirolska (Slovene), Tirool (Estonian), Tyrol (Danish, French, Polish), Tyrolen (Swedish), Tyrolsko (Czech, Slovak), Tyroly (variant in Czech)

== U ==
English name	Other names or former names
Ulster	Alster - Алстер (Macedonian), Olster (Azerbaijani), Olstera (Latvian), Alsteris (Lithuanian), Ълстър (Bulgarian), Ulad (Breton), Uladh (Scottish Gaelic), Ulaidh (Irish), Ulley (Manx), Ulster (Arpitan, French, Italian, Portuguese, Spanish, Turkish), Ultonia (Latin), アルスター (Japanese), 얼스터 (Korean), Ольстер (Ossetian, Ukrainian)
Umbria	Ombrie (French), Umbria (Albanian, Estonian, Finnish, Hungarian, Italian, Latin, Polish, Romanian, Turkish), Úmbria (Catalan, Portuguese), Umbría (Spanish), Umbrien (Danish, German, Swedish), Umbrija (Maltese), Umbrija - Умбрија (Macedonian, Serbian)
Uppland	Uplandia (Latin), Upland (variant in English), Upland - Упланд (Macedonian), Uplândia (Portuguese variant, rare), Uplanti (Finnish), Uppland (Estonian, French, German, Italian, Portuguese variant, Swedish, Turkish)
Upper Austria	Alta Austria (Italian, Leonese, Spanish), Alta Áustria (Portuguese), Alta Àustria (Catalan), Aukštutinė Austrija (Lithuanian), Austria e Epërme (Albanian), Austria de Sus or Austria Superioară (Romanian), Awstrija ta' Fuq (Maltese), Felső-Ausztria (Hungarian), Gornja Austrija (Croatian, Serbian), Górna Austria (Polish), Gorna Avstrija - Горна Австрија (Macedonian), Haute-Autriche (French), Horní Rakousy (Czech), Oberösterreich (Danish, German, Swedish), Opper-Oostenrijk (Dutch), an Ostair Uachtarach (Irish), Ülem-Austria (Estonian), Ylä-Itävalta (Finnish), Yukarı Avusturya (Turkish), Zgornja Avstrija (Slovene)
Uusimaa	Newland (variant in English), an Nualainn (Irish), Nyland (Danish, Swedish), Nylandia (Latin, Polish), Usima - Усима (Macedonian), Uusimaa (Estonia, Finnish, French, Italian, Portuguese, Turkish)

== V ==
English name	Other names or former names
Valais	Valais (Danish, Estonian, Finnish, French, Romanian, Swedish, Turkish), Vale - Вале (Macedonian), Valês (Arpitan), Valezo (Esperanto), Vallese (Italian), Wallis (Dutch, German, variant in Danish and Swedish)
Valtellina	Valtelina - Валтелина (Macedonian), Valtelina (Spanish), Valtellina (Italian, Turkish), Veltlin (German, Hungarian), Veltline (French), Vuclina (Romansh)
Värmland	Värmland (Danish, Estonian, French, Hungarian, Swedish, Turkish), Varmlândia (Portuguese, rare), Vermaland (Icelandic), Vermaland - Вермланд (Macedonian), Vermlanti (Finnish), Wermelandia (Latin)
Västmanland	Västmanland (Swedish, Turkish), Vestmânia (Portuguese, rare), Vestmanland - Вестманланд (Macedonian), Vestmanlanti (Finnish), Vestmannaland (Icelandic), Westmannia (Latin)
Västerbotten	Bothnia Occidentalis or Westrobothnia (Latin), Bótnia Ocidental (Portuguese), Botnie-Occidentale (French), Länsipohja (Finnish), Västerbotten (Swedish, Turkish), Vesterboten - Вестерботен (Macedonian), West Bothnia (variant in English)
Västergötland	Gotalândia Ocidental (Portuguese), Gothie occidentale (France), Länsi-Götanmaa (Finnish), Västergötland (Estonian, Swedish, Turkish), Vesterjetland - Вестерјетланд (Macedonian), Vesüda-Götläniän (Volapük), Westgeatland (Anglo-Saxon), Westrogothia or Gothia Occidentalis (Latin)
Vaud	Vad (Romansh), Vaud (Estonian, French, Hungarian, Italian, Romanian, Swedish, Turkish), Vo - Во (Macedonian), Waadt (Dutch, German), Vôd (Franco-Provençal)
Vendée	Vandea (Italian), Vandeea (Romanian), Vendeia (Portuguese), Vandeјa - Вандеја (Macedonian), Vendée (Danish, Dutch, Estonian, French, German, Hungarian, Irish, Swedish, Turkish, variant in Romanian), Vendeo (Esperanto), Wandea (Polish)
Veneto	Vènet (Catalan), Vènèt (Arpitan), Vénétie (French), Veneto (Albanian, Estonian, Italian, Maltese, Romanian, Finnish, Turkish), Veneto - Венето (Macedonian), Véneto (Portuguese, Spanish), Vêneto (Brazilian Portuguese), Venezia Euganea (variant in Italian, no longer used), Venetien (Danish, Swedish), Wenecja or Wenecja Euganejska (Polish), Benátsko (Czech), Venetia (Latin), Benečija (Slovene)
Vojvodina	Vojvodina - Војводина (Macedonian, Serbian), Vojvodstvo - Војводство or Vojvodovina - Војводовина (variants in Serbian), Vajdaság (Hungarian), Voievodina (variant in Romanian), Voivodina (Catalan, Italian, Portuguese, Romanian, Spanish), Voïvodine (French), Vojvodina (Albanian, Croatian, Danish, Dutch, Estonian, Faroese, Finnish, German, Maltese, Slovak, Swedish), Vojvodina - Войводина (Rusyn), Voyvodina (Turkish), Wojwodina (Polish), Woiwodina (former German), an Vóvaidín (Irish)
Volhynia	Velyn' - Велынь (old Russian variant), Volhínia (Hungarian), Volhinya / Volinya / Volin (Turkish), Volhynie (French), Volhynien (Danish), Volin - װאָלין (Yiddish), Volinia (Italian, Romanian, Spanish), Volínia (Catalan, Portuguese), Voliniјa - Волинија (Macedonian), Volõõnia (Estonian), Volyn' - Волинь (Ukrainian), Volyn' - Волинь (Russian), Volynia (variant in English), Volynie (variant in French), Volynien (Swedish), Wolhynië (Dutch), Wolhynien (German), Wołyń (Polish), Wolynien (variant in German), Volyně (Czech)
Vorpommern	Antaŭpomerio (Esperanto), Antepomerania (variant in Spanish), Elő-Pomeránia (Hungarian), Foarpommeren (Frisian), Forpommern (variant in Danish), Hither Pomerania / Nearer Pomerania / Upper Pomerania (variants in English), Pomerania Anterior (Spanish), Pomerania Anteriore (Italian), Poméranie antérieure (French), Pomerania Inferioară / Anterioară (Romanian), Pomerania Inferior (Latin), Pomerânia Ocidental (Portuguese), Pomerània Occidental (Catalan), Pomorze Przednie / Przedpomorze (Polish), Přední Pomořansko (Czech), Predpomoransko (Slovak), Przédnô Pòmòrskô (Kashubian), Voorpommeren (Afrikaans), Voorpommeren or Voor-Pommeren (Dutch), Vorpommern (Croatian, Danish, Estonian, German, Norwegian, Swedish, Turkish), Vörpommern (Low Saxon), Yukarı Pomeranya (Turkish alternate), Zapadna Pomeranija - Западна Померанија / Predna Pomeranija - Предна Померанија (Macedonian); Swedish Pomerania (former name 1641-1815)
Vosges	Vogesen (German), Vogeserna (Swedish), Vogeserne (Danish), Vogézek (Hungarian), Vogezen (Dutch), Vogezi (Croatian), Vogezi - Вогези (Macedonian), Vogézy (Czech), Vosgi (Italian, Romanian), Vosges (French, Portuguese, Turkish), Vosgos (Spanish, variant in Portuguese), Wasgenwald (former German), Wogezy (Polish)

== W ==
English name	Other names or former names
Wallachia	Eflak (Turkish), Havasalföld (Hungarian), Ţara Românească (Romanian), Valacchia (Italian), Valachie (French), Valachija - Валахия (Russian), Valahia (variant in Romanian), an Valáic (Irish), Valakia (Finnish), Valakiet (Danish, Swedish), Valakkja (Maltese), Valaquia (Spanish), Valàquia (Catalan), Valáquia (Portuguese), Valašsko (Czech), Vallahhia (Estonian), Vlachía - Βλαχία (Greek), Vlaškо - Влашко (Macedonian), Vlaška (Croatian, Serbian), Vllahia (Albanian), Volekhay - װאָלעכײַ (Yiddish), Vološčyna - Волощина (Ukrainian), Walachei (German), Walachia (variant in English), Walachije (Dutch), Wołoszczyzna (Polish)
Wales	an Bhreatain Bheag (Irish), Cymru (Welsh), Gales (Spanish), Galler (Turkish), Galles (Italian), Gal·les (Catalan variant), Kembre (Breton), Kimrujo (Esperanto), País de Gales (Portuguese), País de Gal·les (Catalan), Pays de Galles (French), Ţara Galilor (Romanian), Uellsi (Albanian), Vels - Велс (Macedonian)
Wallonia	Vallonia (Finnish, Italian, Norwegian), Vallonien (Danish, Swedish), Vallonja (Maltese), Valloonia (Estonian), an Vallúin (Irish), Valonia (Albanian, Romanian, Spanish), Valònia (Catalan), Valónia (Portuguese), Valônia (Brazilian Portuguese), Valonie (Arpitan), Valonija (Croatian), Valonija - Валонија (Macedonian), Valonio (Esperanto), Valonsko (Czech), Valonya (Turkish), Wallonföld (Hungarian), Walonia (Polish), Wallonië (Dutch), Wallonie (French), Wallonien (German), Walonreye (Walloon)
Warmia	Ermland (Swedish), Ermland or Ermeland (French, German), Varmia or Warmia (Latin), Varmie (Czech), Varmiја - Вармија (Macedonian), Varmiya (Turkish), Warmia (Polish)
Western Pomerania	Bagpommern (variant in Danish), Batı Pomeranya (Turkish), Lääne-Pommeri (Estonian), Länsi-Pommern (Finnish), Nyugat-Pomeránia (Hungarian), Okcidenta Pomerio (Esperanto), Pomerania Occidental (Spanish), Pomerània Occidental (Catalan), Pomerânia Ocidental (Portuguese), Pomerania Occidentală (Romanian), Pomerania Occidentale (Italian), Pomerania Occidentalis (Latin), Poméranie occidentale (French), Pomerania Perëndimore (Albanian), Pomorze Zachodnie (Polish), Vestpommern (Danish), Vorpommern (German, Swedish), West-Pommeren (Dutch), Zahodnopomorjansko (Slovenian), Zapadna Pomeranija - Западна Померанија (Macedonian), Zapadnopomeransko (Croatian), Západopomoransko (Slovak)
Westphalia	Vestfaal (Estonian alternate), Vestfalia (Italian variant), Vestfália (Portuguese), Vestfalija (Croatian, Lithuanian, Slovene), Vestfalija - Вестфалија (Macedonian, Serbian), Vestfalio (Esperanto), Vestfalya (Turkish), Vestfálsko (Czech), Vesztfália (Hungarian), an Viostfáil (Irish), Wesfalen (Afrikaans), Westfalen (Danish, Dutch, Estonian, Frisian, German, Low Saxon, Norwegian, Swedish), Westfaleye (Walloon), Westfalia (Finnish, Italian, Polish, Romanian, Spanish), Westfàlia (Catalan), Westphalie (French), Zapadna Falačka (Croatian)
Württemberg, Wurttemberg or Wurtemberg	virtemberg (Lojban), Virtemberg - Виртемберг (Macedonian, Serbian), Virtemberga (Latvian), Viurtembergas (Lithuanian), Virtembergia (Latin), Virtembergo (Esperanto), Vurtemberg (Tolysh), Vurtemberga, Wuerttemberg or Württemberg (Portuguese), Vürtemberq (Azerbaijani, Crimean Tatar), Vyrtemberg (Albanian), Vytemvérghi - Βυτεμβέργη (Greek), Vyurtemberg (Kara-Kalpak), Vyurtemberg - Вюртемберг (Russian, Uzbek), Vürtän (Volapük), Wiattmbeag (Bavarian), Wirtembergia (Polish), Wöötebersch (Colognian), Wuertemberch (Western Frisian), Wúrtemberch (Frisian), Wurtemberg (Aragonese, Catalan, French, Guarani, Spanish, Tagalog), Würtemberg (Basque), Wurtemberga (Kashubian), Würtembersko (Czech, Slovak), Wurtembierich (Saterland Frisian), Wurttembaarg (Low Saxon), Wurttemberg (Ido, Kurdish, Romanian), Württemberg (Afrikaans, Alemannic, Asturian, Aymara, Balinese, Bosnian, Breton, Catalan, Cebuano, Cornish, Corsican, Croatian, Danish, Dagbani, Dutch, Emiliano-Romagnolo, Estonian, Faroese, Finnish, Friulian, Galician, German, Hungarian, Icelandic, Iloko, Javanese, Indonesian, Interlingua, Interlingue, Irish, Italian, Kongo, Ladin, Ladino, Ligurian, Limburgish, Lombard, Low German, Luxembourgish, Manx, Malagasy, Malay, Northern Sami, Northern Frisian, Norwegian, Occitan, Palatine German, Pampanga, Papiamento, Piedmontese, Romanian, Romansh, Quechua, Sardinian, Scots, Scottish Gaelic, Sicilian, Slovenian, Sranan Tongo, Sraran Tongo, Swahili, Swedish, Turkish, Turkmen, Venetian, Vietnamese, Waray, Welsh, West Flemish, Yoruba, Zazaki, Zeelandic), Württembergska (Lower Sorbian, Upper Sorbian), Ƿyrttemberg (Old English), Wirtenberg (medieval German)

== Z ==
English name	Other names or former names
Zealand (Denmark)	Sæland (Faroese), Seeland (Dutch, French, German), Šeland - Шеланд (Macedonian alternate), Selandia (Spanish), Selàndia (Catalan), Sjaelland (Basque), Sjáland (Icelandic), Sjælland (Czech, Danish, Hungarian, Indonesian, Norwegian, Turkish), Själland (Swedish), Själlanti (Finnish), an tSéalainn (Irish), Zeland (Bosnian, Croatian), Zeland - Зеланд (Macedonian, Serbian), Zelanda (Albanian, Italian), Zelandia (Polish), Zelândia (Portuguese), Zelandija (Lithuanian)
Zeeland (Netherlands)	Batavia (Latin), Celandia (Galician), Seelân (Frisian), Seeland (German), Seelanti (Finnish), Zeelaand (Dutch Low Saxon), Zeeland (Danish, standard Dutch, English variant, Estonian, Finnish variant, Hungarian, Swedish), Zêeland (West Flemish), Zeêland (Zealandic), Zeelanda (Romanian), Zeland - Зеланд (Macedonian), Zelanda (Albanian, Catalan, Italian, Spanish, Turkish), Zélande (French), Zelandia (Polish), Zelândia (Portuguese), Zéland (Czech), Zelando (Esperanto), Zieland (Limburgian)
Žitný ostrov	Csallóköz (Hungarian), Grosse Schüttinsel (German), Rye Island (English variant), Wyspa Żytnia (Polish), Büyük Çavdar Adası (Turkish)
Zug	Cug - Цуг (Macedonian), Tsoug (Franco-Provençal), Tugium (Latin), Zoug (French), Zug (Danish, Dutch, Estonian, German, Hungarian, Swedish, Turkish), Zugo (Esperanto, Italian, Venetian)

== See also ==
- Endonym and exonym
- List of alternative country names
- List of country names in various languages
- List of European rivers with alternative names
- List of European cities with alternative names
- List of Latin place names in Europe
- List of Asian regions with alternative names
- Latin names of regions
- List of places
- Polish historical regions
