= List of names of Asian cities in different languages =

This is a list of cities in Asia that have several names in different languages, including former names. Many cities have different names in different languages. Some cities have also undergone name changes for political or other reasons.

This article does not offer any opinion about what the "original", "official", "real", or "correct" name of any city is or was. Cities are listed alphabetically by their current best-known name in English. The English version is followed by variants in other languages, in alphabetical order by name including any historical variants and former names. Foreign names that are the same as their English equivalents may be listed.

Note: The blue asterisks generally indicate the availability of a Wikipedia article in that language for that city; it also provides additional reference for the equivalence. Red asterisks or a lack of an asterisk indicate that no such article exists, and that these equivalents without further footnotes should be viewed with caution.

== A ==
English Name	Other names or former names
(Russia) Abakan	Ağban - Ағбан (Khakass),^{[KNAB]} Abacanus (Latin*), Ábāhām - 阿巴坎 (Cantonese), Abakan - Абакан (Macedonian, Russian), Abakan - アバカン (Japanese), Ābākǎn - 阿巴坎 (traditional and simplified characters) (Mandarin Chinese), Ust’-Abakanskoe - Усть-Абаканское (former Russian, pre–1931)^{[KNAB]}, अबाकान (Hindi), اباکان (Urdu), அபாக்கன் (Tamil), آپَکان (Balochi)
(Israel) Acre	Acē (Latin), Acra (Romanian), Acre (English, French, Galician, Portuguese, Spanish), Acri (Italian), Akka (Polish, Turkish) Ákē - Ἄκη (Ancient Greek), Akkon (German), Áko – עַכּוֹ (Hebrew), Akre (Basque), Eka (Kurdish) ʿk - 𐤏𐤊 (Phoenician), Ptolemāis (Imperial Latin), ꜥkꜣ (Ancient Egyptian)
(India) Ahmedabad	Amdāvād - અમદાવાદ (Gujarati), Ahmedabad - अहमदाबाद (Hindi, Marathi), احمد آباد (Punjabi - Shahmukhi, Urdu), Ahmedabad - ਅਹਿਮਦਾਬਾਦ (Punjabi - Gurmukhi), Ahmedabad - আহমেদাবাদ (Bengali), Ahmedabad - ଅହମଦାବାଦ (Odia), Ahmedabad - அகமதாபாது (Tamil), Ahmedabad - ಅಹಮದಾಬಾದ್ (Kannada), Ahmedabad - അഹമ്മദാബാദ് (Malayalam), Karnāvatī - कर्नावती (Sanskrit)
(Syria) Aleppo	Alep (Catalan*, Croatian*, French*, Romanian*, Slovene*), Alep - Алеп (Macedonian, Serbian)*, Alepas (Lithuanian)*, Alepo (Basque*, Esperanto*, Galician*, Spanish*), Ālèpō - 阿勒颇 (simplified characters) / 阿勒頗 (traditional characters) (Chinese)*, Alepo or Haleba (Latvian)*, Alepo or Ḩalab (Estonian)*, Alepo or Aleppo (Portuguese)*, Aleppo (Breton*, Czech*, Danish*, Dutch*, Finnish*, German*, Indonesian*, Italian*, Norwegian [Bokmål]*, Polish*, Swedish*, Welsh*), Aleppó (Hungarian)*, Aleppo - Алеппо or Khaleb - Халеб (Russian*,^{[KNAB]} Ukrainian*), Aleppu (Sicilian)*, Alippu (Inuktitut), Allepo - 알레포 (Korean)*, Areppo - アレッポ (Japanese)*, Ash-Shahbā’ (lit., "the gray one") - الشهباء (Arabic [rare]),^{[KNAB]} Beroea (Latin)*,^{[KNAB]}, Beroia - Βέροια (Ancient Greek), Chalépio(n) - Χαλέπιο(ν) (Greek),^{[KNAB]} Hadad / Halab (Syriac), Halab (Uzbek), Ḥalab - حلب (Arabic*,^{[KNAB]} Ottoman Turkish), Halab - Ҳалаб (Tajik)*, H̱aleb - חַלֶבּ / H̱āleb - חאלב / ארם צובה Aram Zoba - (Hebrew)*,^{[KNAB]} Halep - Հալեպ (Armenian)*,^{[KNAB]} Halep (Turkish)*,^{[KNAB]} Heleb (Kurdish)*,^{[KNAB]} Hələb (Azerbaijani), Vérria - Βέρροια (Hellenistic & Byzantine Greek), ალეპო (Georgian), ಅಲೆಪ್ಪೊ (Kannada), హాలెప్పో (Telugu), अलेप्पो (Marathi), Halab - हलब (Hindi), Ḥalab - حلب (Urdu), ஆலெப்போ (Tamil), Halab - হলব (Bengali) - ھَلَپ (Balochi), Ha-lam - 𒄩𒇴 (Elamite)
(India) Allahabad	Illahabad - इलाहाबाद (Hindi *), Elahabad - এলাহাবাদ (Bengali), Alakapat - அலகாபாது (Tamil), Alhabad - અલ્હાબાદ (Gujarati), الٰہ آباد (Urdu). Official name: Prayagraj (English), Prayāgarāja - प्रयागराज (Hindi), Proyagraj - প্রয়াগরাজ (Bengali). Other names: Prayag (English), Prayag - प्रयाग (Hindi), Illahabas (English), Prayaga-ಪ್ರಯಾಗ (Kannada)
(Kazakhstan) Almaty	Ālāmùtú - 阿拉木圖 (traditional characters) / 阿拉木图 (simplified characters) (Mandarin Chinese), Alma Ata (Dutch, Finnish, French, German, Indonesian, Interlingua, Italian, Portuguese, Romanian, Sicilian, Slovak, Slovene), Alma-Ata - Алма-Ата (Macedonian, Russian, Serbian) Almá-Atá (former Spanish), Ałma Ata (Polish), Álma-Áty - Άλμα-Άτυ (Greek), Almaata - Алмаата (Karakalpak), Almaato - Алмаато (Tajik), Almata (Latvian, Lithuanian), Almatë (Albanian), Olma-Ota (Uzbek) Almati (Catalan, Galician, Hungarian), Almatı (Crimean Tatar, Turkish), Almato (Esperanto), Almatõ (Estonian), Almaty - Алмати (Ukrainian*), Almaty - Алматы (Kazakh*, Russian alternative), Almatý (Spanish), Almuta - ئالمۇتا (Uyghur), Armatii (Inuktitut), Arumatoi - アルマトイ (Japanese)*, ალმა-ათა / ალმატი (Georgian), ಅಲ್ಮಾಟಿ (Kannada), अलमती (Marathi), ఎల్మాటీ (Telugu), Olmaota [Almäatä - Олмаота] (former Uzbek), Vernyj - Верный (former Russian, 1867–1921), Viernyi (former French), अलमाती (Hindi, Sanskrit), آلما اتا (Urdu), அல்மாதி (Tamil), آلماتی (Balochi), আলমাতী Almatī (Bengali)
(Jordan) Amman	Amã (Portuguese), Aman (Novial, Slovene), Aman - Аман (Macedonian, Serbian) Amán (Galician), Amàn (Haitian Creole), Amanas (Lithuanian), Amano (Esperanto), Amans (Samogitian), Амман - Amman (Russian), Amman (Inuktitut), Amman - アンマン (Japanese), Ammán (Czech, Hungarian, Slovak, Spanish), ‘Ammān (Estonian), عمان - Ammān (Arabic), Ammāna (Latvian), Philadelphia (Latin), Philadélpheia - Φιλαδέλφεια (Greek [archaic]), Rabbat Ammon - רבת עמון (Hebrew), 安曼 (Mandarin Chinese), ამანი (Georgian), Amman - अम्मान (Hindi), ಅಮ್ಮನ್ (Kannada), అమ్మాన్ (Telugu), Ammāna - अम्मान (Marathi, Sanskrit), அம்மான் (Tamil), عمّان (Urdu), اَمان (Balochi), আম্মান Amman (Bengali)
(Turkey) Ankara	Aṁkārā - అంకారా (Telugu), Ancara (Galician, Portuguese), Ancyra (Latin), Ăng-kā-lá - 安卡拉 (Mindong), Angora (former English, former Italian, former Romanian, former French), Ángyra - Άγκυρα (Greek), Ángyra - Ἄγκυρα (Ancient Greek), Ānkǎlā - 安卡拉 (Mandarin Chinese), Ankara - Անկարա (Armenian), Ankara - Анкара (Abkhaz, Macedonian, Russian, Serbian), Ankara - ანკარა (Georgian), Ankara - アンカラ (Japanese), Ānḳarah - آنقره (Ottoman Turkish), Anqara (Zazaki), Änqarä - Әнкарә (Tatar),^{[KNAB]} Ankaro (Esperanto), Anqara (Uzbek), Änq̇ara - Аьнкьара (Lak), Anqarah - أنقرة (Arabic), Aqqara/Atqara (Inuktitut), Enqere (Kurdish), Enqere - ئه‌نقه‌ره (Uyghur), Ngōnkālā - 安卡拉 (Cantonese), Aṅkārā - अङ्कारा (Hindi, Sanskrit), Anqara - انقرہ (Urdu), ಅಂಕಾರಾ (Kannada), அங்காரா (Tamil), آنکارا (Balochi), আঙ্করা Aṅkora (Bengali)
(Turkey) Antioch	Anniukkia (Inuktitut), Anţākīyah أنطاكيا (Arabic), Antakya (Azerbaijani, Turkish*), Antioch-on-the-Orontes (extended name in English), Antioch (Scottish Gaelic), Antioche (French)*, Antiocheia - Ἀντιόχεια (Ancient Greek),^{[KNAB]} Antiochia (Hungarian*, Interlingua, Latin, Slovak), Antiochia or Antiochia/Antioch/Antiochien am Orontes (German)*, Antiochia or Antiochia di Siria (Italian)*, Antiochia or Antiochia Syryjska (Polish)*, Antiochia or Antiochia vid Orontes (Swedish)*, Antióchia - Αντιόχεια (Greek), Antióchia i epí Dáfni - Αντιόχεια η επί Δάφνη / Antióchia i epí Oróntu - Αντιόχεια η επί Ορόντου / Antióchia i Megáli - Αντιόχεια η Μεγάλη (extended names in Greek), Antjokja (Maltese), Antiochie (Czech)*, Antiochië (Dutch)*, Antiohia (Romanian), Antiohija (Croatian, Bosnian), Antiohija - Антиохија (Macedonian, Serbian*), Antiok‘ - Անտոք (Armenian),^{[KNAB]} Antiokia (Indonesian, Danish*, Finnish*), Antiokia - アンティオキア (Japanese), Anṭiokia - ܐܢܛܝܘܟܝܐ (Syriac), Anţiokia - ანტიოქია (Georgian),^{[KNAB]} Antioquia (Catalan), Antioquía (Spanish)*, Antióquia (Portuguese)*, Antioxija - Антиохия (Russian historical),^{[KNAB]} Antioxiya (Azerbaijani alternative), Ēṁṭjhōk - ఏంటియోక్ (Telugu), अन्ताकिया (Hindi), انتاکیا (Urdu), அந்தியோச்சு (Tamil), Āntíā - 安提阿 (Mandarin Chinese), Antiok - 안 디 옥 (Korean), আন্তাকিয়া / Antakiya (Bengali)
(Iran) Ardabil	Ardabel - Ардабел (Tajik), Ardabil - Ардабил (Macedonian), Ardabīl - اردبیل (Persian),^{[KNAB]} Ərdəbil - اردبیل (Azerbaijani),^{[KNAB]} Ardebil' - Ардебиль (Russian),^{[KNAB]} Artawil - Արտաւիլ (Armenian), Erdebil (Turkish, Zazaki), Erdebîl - اردبیل (Kurdish), Ardabel - اردبیل (Urdu) . அருதாபில் (Tamil), আর্দবীল / Ardobīl (Bengali)
(Turkey) Ardahan	Ardachán - Αρνταχάν (Greek), Ardahan (Turkish), Ardahan - Արդահան (Armenian),^{[KNAB]} Ardahan - Ардахан (Macedonian), Arţaani - არტაანი (Georgian) Ardagan - Ардаган (Russian), Ərdəhan (Azerbaijani), Artahan - Արտահան (Armenian alternative),^{[KNAB]} Erdêxan/Erdêhan (Kurdish), اردھان (Urdu), அருதகான் (Tamil), আর্দহান / Ardohan (Bengali)
(Turkmenistan) Ashgabat	Aixkhabad (Catalan), Ašchabád (Czech, Slovak), Aschabadum (Latin), Aschchabad, Aschgabad or Aschgabat (German), Aşgabat or Aşkabat (Turkish),Asjabad (Spanish), Asgabate (Portuguese), Ashkhabad - Ашхабад (Russian), Aşhabad (Italian, Montenegrin, Romanian), Ašhabad - Ашхабад (Macedonian, Serbian), Ašhabada (Latvian), Ashgabat/Ashkabad - अश्गाबात / अश्क़ाबाद (Hindi), Aşgabat (Turkmen), Asiqhapaati (Inuktitut), Ashigabādo - アシガバード (Japanese), Ashxobod (Uzbek), Asjchabad (Dutch), Aşqabad (Azerbaijani), Aszchabad (Polish), Išq Ābād (Arabic), აშხაბადი / აშგაბატი (Georgian), عشق‌آباد (Persian), అస్కాబాద్ (Telugu), Iśq Ābād - عشق آباد (Urdu), அக்காபாது (Tamil),اِشک آباد (Balochi), এশকাবাদ / Eshkabad (Bengali)
(Kazakhstan) Astana	Akmola (variant in Finnish), Ostona (Uzbek), Akmola (former Russian, 1992–1998),^{[KNAB]} Akmoła (former Polish), Akmolinsk - Акмолинск (former Russian, pre-1961),^{[KNAB]} Aqmola - Ақмола (former Kazakh pre-1961, 1992–1998),^{[KNAB]} Aqmulla - Акмулла (former Tatar),^{[KNAB]} Aqmulla - Аҡмулла (former Bashkir),^{[KNAB]} Aseutana - 아스타나 (Korean*), Astana (Dutch, Finnish, Italian, Latvian, Polish, Romanian, Scottish Gaelic, Turkish, Azerbaijani), Astana - Астана (Belarusian, Kazakh, Macedonian, Russian, Serbian*), Astānā - अस्ताना (Hindi, Sanskrit), Astana - ئاستانا (Uyghur), Astanà (Catalan), Astaná (Spanish), Asţana - ასტანა (Georgian), Asutana/Aqsana/Angmulaq (Inuktitut), Asutana - アスタナ (Japanese*), అస్తానా (Telugu), Celinograd - Целиноград (former Russian, 1961–1992),^{[KNAB]} Qaraötkel - Қараөткел (obsolete Kazakh unofficial),^{[KNAB]} Tselīnograd - Целиноград (former Kazakh, 1961–1992)^{[KNAB]}, استانا (Urdu), அசுதானா (Tamil), আস্তানা / Astana (Bengali)

== B ==
English Name	Other names or former names
(Iraq) Baghdad	Bāgaakdaaht - 巴格達 (Cantonese), Bagadād - बगदाद (Hindi, Sanskrit), Bagdá (Portuguese), Bagdad (Danish, French, German, Spanish, historic English), Bagdad - Багдад (Bulgarian, Macedonian, Mongolian, Ossetian, Russian, Serbian), Bagdad - באגדאד (Yiddish), Baġdād - بغداد (Arabic), بگدات (Balochi), Bağdad (Azerbaijani), Bağdad - Багдад (Kyrgyz, Tatar), Bağdad - Бағдад (Bashkir, Kazakh), Baǧdad - Багъдад (Avar, Kumyk, Lak, Lezgian),^{[KNAB]} Baḡdâd - בגדאד [בַּעְ'דַּאדּ] (Hebrew), Baḡdād - ܒܓܕܐܕ (Syriac), Baǧdat - Багъдат (Tabasaran),^{[KNAB]} Bagdat (Turkmen),^{[KNAB]} Bağdat (Crimean Tatar, Turkish),^{[KNAB]} Baǧdati - ბაღდადი (Georgian,^{[KNAB]} Mingrelian), Bagdatum (Latin), Bagdaza (Hausa),^{[KNAB]} Baġdod - Бағдод (Tajik), Bāgédá - 巴格達 (traditional characters)/ 巴格达 (simplified characters) (historical Mandarin Chinese), Bageudadeu - 바그다드 (Korean), Baghdaad - ބަޣުދާދު (Divehi), Baghdad - باغداد (Uyghur), Bagudaddo - バグダード (Japanese),^{[KNAB]} Bajdad - БаІдад (Chechen),^{[KNAB]} Baldacco (historical Italian), Bałdad - Բաղդադ (Armenian), Bałtat - Բաղտատ (Western Armenian), Bàodá - 報達 (traditional characters)/ 报达 (simplified characters) (historic Mandarin Chinese), Baqdaad (Somali), Bát-đa (Vietnamese),^{[KNAB]} Bǣkdǣt - แบกแดด (Thai), Beẍa (Kurdish alternative), Beẍda (Kurdish), Beẍda - بەغدا (Sorani Kurdish), Boudaaht - 報達 (historic Cantonese), Pahtat - Пахтат (Chuvash), Vagdáti - Βαγδάτη (Greek),^{[KNAB]}, بغداد (Urdu), பாகுதாது (Tamil), বগদাদ / Bogdad (Bengali)
(Azerbaijan) Baku	Bacou (former French), Bacu (Portuguese*), Bacua (Alternative Latin), Bādkūbe - بادکوبه (former Persian), Bakı (Azerbaijani)*, Bakku - Бакку (Tabasaran), Bakoe (Afrikaans, Dutch*), Bakou (French)*, Bakoú - Μπακού (Greek*), Bakox (Chechen), Baku (Croatian*, Crimean Tatar*, Czech*, Danish*, Finnish*, German*, Hungarian*, Indonesian*, Italian*, Latin*, Latvian*, Lithuanian*, Maltese *, Norwegian*, Polish*, Romanian*, Slovak*, Swedish*, Tat), Bākū - باکو (Arabic, Persian), Bākū - बाकू (Hindi, Sanskrit), Baku - باكو (Urdu), Baku - Баку (Avar*, Belarusian*, Bulgarian*, Lezghi, Macedonian*, Ossetic*, Russian*, Serbian*, Tatar*, Tsakhur, Ukrainian*), Baku - 巴庫 (Mandarin Chinese)*, Baku - בקו (Hebrew)*, Bakū - バクー (Japanese)*, Bakû - باکوو (Kurdish)*, Bakú (Spanish)*, Bākū - ܒܟܘ (Syriac), Bakü (Turkish)*, Baku - באַקו (Yiddish)*, Bākūyah (historic Arabic), Bakuu (Estonian)*, Baqu - Բաքու (Armenian)*, Bako - ბაქო (Georgian)*, Bokü (Talyshi), பாகு(Tamil), বাকু / Baku (Bengali)
(Indonesia) Banda Aceh	Banda Aceh (Indonesian, Malay), Banda Acèh (Acehnese, Javanese), Banda Ačeh - Банда Ачех (Macedonian), Bāndā Āceh - बान्दा आचेह(Hindi, Sanskrit), Bandā`āčhe - บันดาร์อาเจะห์ (Thai), Bāandaat Achàih - 班達亞齊 (Cantonese), Banda Atjeh (Dutch, Indonesian old spelling), Banda Atjèh (Acehnese old spelling), Bāndā Ātšīh - باندا آتشيه (Arabic), Bandar Aceh (historic Indonesian), Bandar Aceh Darussalam (historic Indonesian [long form]), Bandaache - 반다아체 (Korean), Bāndáyàqí - 班達亞齊 (Mandarin Chinese), Dàyàqí - 大亞齊 (Mandarin Chinese alternative), Koetaradja (historic Indonesian old spelling, pre–1962), Kota Radja (historic Dutch, historic English, pre–1962), Kutaradja (historic Acehnese, historic Indonesian old spelling, pre–1962), باندا آچہ (Urdu), பாந்தா ஆச்சே (Tamil), বান্দা আচেহ (Bengali)
(Iran) Bandar Abbas	Bandar-e ‘Abbās, Bandar ‘Abbās, Bandar Abbās - बंदर अब्बास (Hindi), Bandar Abas - Бандар Абас (Macedonian), Bandar ‘Abbāsī (Romanization from Persian); Cambarão, Porto Comorão (Portuguese); Gamrun, Gumrun (Dutch); Gombroon，Ābāsī - 阿巴斯 (Mandarin Chinese), Bandaru Abbāsu バンダル・アッバース (Japanese), Bandaleu Abbaseu - 반다르 압바스 (Korean), Bender Abbas - (Turkish), Бендер-Аббас (Russian), Bəndər Abbas (Azerbaijani), বন্দর আব্বাস / Bondor Abbas (Bengali), گمبرون or بندر ھباس (Balochi)
(Turkey) Bandırma	Bandırma (Turkish), Bandërma (Albanian), Bandirma, Бандирма (Serbian), باندرمة (Arabic), Panormos - Πάνορμος (Greek)
(Indonesia) Bandung	Bānaduṅga - बानदुङ्ग (Hindi, Sanskrit), Bandon - バンドン (Japanese), Bandoeng (formerly Dutch), Bandhung (Javanese), Bandung, Бандунг (Cyrillic Script), Bandungas (Lithuanian), Bandungo (Esperanto), Bandunj - باندونج (Arabic), Wànlóng - 萬隆 (Mandarin Chinese), بانڈونگ (Urdu), பாந்துங்கு (Tamil)
(India) Bengaluru	ಬೆಂಗಳೂರು-Beṅgaḷūru (Kannada), Beṅgaḷūru - बेङ्गळूरु (Sanskrit), Bangarōru - バンガロール (Japanese), ბენგალორი (Georgian), બેંગલોર (Gujarati), बंगलौर (Hindi [traditional]), बेंगलूरु (Hindi [phonetic transcription of Kannada name]), 뱅갈로(Korean), ബാംഗ്ലൂര് (Malayalam), बंगळूर (Marathi), பெங்களூர் (Tamil), బెంగుళూరు (Telugu), banglor - بنگلور (Urdu), Bānjiāluó'r - 班加罗尔 (Mandarin Chinese), Bangalor - Бангалор (Macedonian, Russian), বেঙ্গালুরু / Bengaluru (Bengali), بنگالور (Balochi)
(Thailand) Bangkok	Baiṅkôk - बैंकॉक (Hindi), Bancác (Irish), Bangóg - Μπανγκόγκ (Greek), Banguecoque or Bangkok (Portuguese), Băng Cốc (Vietnamese), Bangkok - Бангкок (Macedonian*), Bankoko (Esperanto)*, Bankoku - バンコク (Japanese), Krung Thep Maha Nakhon - กรุงเทพมหานคร (Thai), Màngǔ - 曼谷 (Mandarin Chinese), Bangkok - ბანგკოკი (Georgian), 방콕 (Korean), பாங்காக்கு (Tamil), బేంగ్కాక్ (Telugu), بانگ کوک (Urdu), Baanggog - ບາງກອກ (Lao), Byāṅkāk - ब्याङ्काक् (Sanskrit)
(Bangladesh) Barisal	Borishal - বরিশাল (Bengali), Barīshāl - بریشال (Arabic, Persian, Urdu, Western Punjabi, Pashto, Sindhi, Kashmiri), Barisal - Барисал (Macedonian), Bariśāl - बरिशाल (Sanskrit, Hindi, Nepali), बारिसाल (Marathi), Barisāl (Indonesian, Malay, Cebuano), Барисал (Bulgarian, Mongolian, Russian), Барісал (Ukrainian), Barishal (German), Barizalo (Esperanto), Barisalo (or Barisalas) (Lithuanian), Barisalin (Finnish) Historical names: Bakla-Chandradwip (English), বাকলা-চন্দ্রদ্বীপ - Bakla-Chondrodeep (Bengali), باکلا-چندردویپ - Baklā-Chandrādīp (Persian, Urdu), بكلا-تشاندرا ديب - Baklā-Tshāndrā Dīp (Arabic) Other names: Gird-e-Bandar (The Great Port) - (English), গিরদে বন্দর - Girde Bondor (Bengali), ইসমাইলপুর - Ismailpur, Backergunge - (English), বাকেরগঞ্জ - Bakergonj (Bengali)
(Iraq) Basra	Al-Baṣrah - البصرة (Arabic),^{[KNAB]} Baçorá (Portuguese), Bāshìlā - 巴士拉 (traditional and simplified characters) (Mandarin Chinese), Bāsihlā - 巴士拉 (Cantonese), Basora (Spanish), Basra (German, Indonesian, Turkish), Basra - Басра (Bulgarian, Macedonian, Russian^{[KNAB]}, Serbian, Ukrainian), Basra - Բասրա (Armenian), Baṣra - בצרה (Hebrew), Baṣrā - ܒܨܪܐ (Syriac), Basrā - बसरा (Hindi), Baṣrah - بصره (Persian, Urdu), Bassorah (French),^{[KNAB]} Bəsrə (Azerbaijani), Besir (Kurdish alternative),^{[KNAB]} Besra - بەسرە (Kurdish),^{[KNAB]} Besre - بەسرە (Sorani Kurdish), Busra(h) (historic English),^{[KNAB]} Bussora(h) (historic English),^{[KNAB]} Vasóra - Βασόρα (Greek), பாசுரா (Tamil), Bosra - বসরা (Bengali, Assamese)
(China) Beijing	Bắc Kinh (Vietnamese), Baekging (Zhuang), Bākgìng - 北京 (Cantonese), Bākpìhng - 北平 (Cantonese [archaic]), Beežin - Бээжин / Bejžin - Бэйжин (Mongolian), Běijīng - 北京 (Chinese), Beijing - 베이징 (Korean [modern]), Beijing (Romanian), Běipíng - 北平 (Chinese [archaic, also alternate in Taiwan]), Béising / Péicing (Irish), Bêjing - པེ་ཅིང (Tibetan), Béyjing - بېيجىڭ / Бейҗиң (Uighur), Bījiṅg - बीजिङ्ग् (Hindi, Sanskrit), Bukgyeong - 북경 / 北京 (Korean [former]), Cambaluc (Franco-Venetian), Kanbalik - ᠻᠠᠨᠪᠠᠯᠢᠺ (Middle Mongol), Pak-kiaⁿ - 北京 (Minnan, Taiwanese), Pechino (Italian), Pechinum (Latin), Pecin / Beijing (Welsh), Pékin (French), Pekin - 北京 / ペキン (Japanese), Pekin (Polish, Turkish, former Romanian), Pekin - Пекин (former Romanian, Russian), Pekín (Spanish), Peking (Croatian, Czech, Danish, Dutch, English [alternate], Estonian, Finnish, German, Hungarian, Slovenian, Swedish), Peking - Пекинг (Macedonian*, Serbian), Pekino (Esperanto), * Pekíno - Πεκίνο (Greek), Pequim (Portuguese), Pequín (Catalan), პეკინი (Georgian), ಬೀಜಿಂಗ್ (Kannada), பெய்சிங்கு (Tamil), బేజింగ్ (Telugu), ปักกิ่ง (Thai), بیئی جنگ (Urdu), Hanbalık (Turkish [alternate]), Pagging -ປັກກິ່ງ (Lao), بئیجینگ (Balochi)
(Lebanon) Beirut	Bayrūt - بيروت (Arabic, Urdu, Persian), Bèilǔtè - 贝鲁特/貝魯特 (simplified and traditional characters) (Mandarin Chinese), Beiroet (Afrikaans, Dutch), Beirut (Catalan, Croatian, Danish, Estonian, German, Italian, Norwegian, Romanian, Spanish, Swedish), Beirut - ביירות (Hebrew), Beirūta (Latvian), Beirutas (Lithuanian), Beirute (Portuguese), Beiruteu - 베이루트 (Korean), Beiruti - ბეირუთი (Georgian), Beirūto - ベイルート (Japanese), Bejrut (Polish, Slovenian), Bejrút (Czech, Hungarian, Slovak), Bejrut - Бейрут (Russian, Belarusian, Bulgarian, Ukrainian), Bejrut - Бејрут (Macedonian*, Serbian), Berytus (Latin), Beyarūt - बेयरूत (Hindi), Beyrouth (French), Beyrut (Turkish), Beyrut - Բեյրութ (Armenian), பெய்ரூட்டு (Tamil), Boirut - বৈরুত (Bengali), Virytós - Βηρυτός (Greek)
(Indonesia) Bengkulu	Bangka Hulu (Indonesian [archaic], Malay [archaic]), Bencoolen (former English colonial name), Benkoelen (Dutch), Beṅkulū - बेंकुलू (Hindi, Sanskrit), Benkulu - Бенкулу (Macedonian), Benkuru - ベンクル (Japanese), Kota Bengkulu (Indonesian, Malay), బెంగ్కూళు నగరం (Telugu), بنگ کولو (Urdu), பெங்குலு (Tamil)
(Palestine) Bethlehem	Bait Laḥm - بيت لحم (Arabic), bait-al-laham بیت اللحم (Urdu), Betälḥem - ቤተልሔም (Amharic), Baitalham - बैतलहम (Hindi), An Beithil (Irish), Bedeullehem - 베들레헴 (Korean), Belém (Portuguese), Belén (Spanish), Bethel (Old Irish), Bethlehem (Dutch, German), Bethléem (French), Bethleem - Βηθλεέμ (Ancient Greek), Bethlehemum (Latin), Betleem (Romanian), Bet Leḥem - בית לחם (Hebrew), Betlehem (Croatian, Danish, Finnish, Hungarian, Icelandic, Norwegian, Slovak, Slovenian, Swedish), Bet'łehem - Բեթղեհեմ (Armenian), Betlejem (Polish), Betlem (Catalan), Betlém (Czech), Bētleme (Latvian), Betlemi - ბეთლემი (Georgian), Betlemme (Italian), Betliejus (Lithuanian), Betsurehemu - ベツレヘム (Japanese), Beyt-e Lahm - بیت لحم (Persian), Beytüllahim (Turkish), Bēþlaihaim - 𐌱𐌴𐌸𐌻𐌰𐌹𐌷𐌰𐌹𐌼 (Gothic), Beþþleæm (Middle English), Bòlíhèng - 伯利恒 (simplified characters) / 伯利恆 (traditional characters) (Mandarin Chinese), Petlemm (Estonian), Viflaim (Alternative Romanian), Vifléem - Вифлеем (Russian), Viflejem - Віфлеєм (Ukrainian), Vithleem - Βηθλεέμ (Greek), Vitléem - Витлеем (Bulgarian), Vitlejem - Витлејем (Serbian), ಬೆಥ್ ಲೆಹೆಮ್ (Kannada), বৈতে লহম Boite Lohom (Bengali)
(Kyrgyzstan) Bishkek	Bichkek (French), Bischkek (German), Bishukeku - ビシュケク (Japanese), Bisjkek (Dutch), Biškek (Croatian, Slovenian), Biskek - बिस्केक (Hindi), Biškek - Бишкек (Macedonian, Serbian), Bişkek (Romanian, Turkish), Biškeka (Latvian), Biškekas (Lithuanian), Biszkek (Polish), Bixkek (Catalan), బిష్కెక్ (Telugu), ბიშკეკი (Georgian); Frunze (former name), بش کیک (Urdu), பிட்கேக்கு (Tamil), Bǐshíkǎikè - 比什凯克 (simplified characters) / 比什凱克 (traditional characters) (Mandarin Chinese)
(Uzbekistan) Bukhara	Boechara (Dutch), Boxārā - بُخارا (Persian), Buchara (Italian, Polish), Buhara (Finnish, Turkish, Turkmen), Buhara - ブハラ (Japanese), Buhara - Бухара (Macedonian*, Serbian), Buhhaara (Estonian), Bujara (Spanish), Bukharà (Catalan), Bukhara - Бұхара (Kazakh), Bukhara - Бухара (Russian), Bukhoro - Бухоро (Tajik), Buxara (Azerbaijani), Buxoro (Uzbek), ბუხარა (Georgian), బుఖారా (Telugu), بخارہ (Urdu), புக்காரா (Tamil), Bōkhara - বোখারা (Bengali)
(Turkey) Bursa	Boersa (Dutch), Brousse (former French), Brusa (former Bosnian), Bursa (Azerbaijani, Dutch, Italian, Romanian, Turkish), Bursa - בורסה (Hebrew), Bursa - बुर्सा (Hindi), Bursa - Бурса (Macedonian*, Serbian*), Burusa - ブルサ (Japanese), Proúsa - Προύσα (Greek), Prusa (Latin), ბურსა (Georgian), బుర్సా (Telugu), Borsa بورسا (Urdu), புர்சா (Tamil)

== C ==
English Name	Other names or former names
(Turkey) Çankırı	Çankırı (Turkish), Gankıra (Hittite), Gangra (Greek), Cankiri (English, French, German, Spanish), Čankr - Чанкр or Čankiri - Чанкири (Macedonian*), Çenğiri (Ottoman Turkish), Çangırı (former Turkish), چانکیری (Urdu), கங்கிரா (Tamil)
(Russia) Chelyabinsk	Čalabinsk – Чалябінск (Belarusian*), Čeläba oš – Челяба ош (Moksha*), Čeläbinsk (Veps*), Čelepi – Челепи (Chuvash*), Celiabinsca (Latin*), Čeliabinsķi – ჩელიაბინსკი (Georgian*), Ćeljaba – Челяба (Komi-Permyak*), Čeljabinsk – Челябинск (Russian*),^{[KNAB]} Čeljabinsk – Челябінск (Ukrainian*), Čeljabinsk – Чељабинск (Macedonian*), Çelyabi – Челябі (Kazakh*),^{[KNAB]} Cheliábinsk (Spanish*), Chēlǐyǎbīnsīkè – 車里雅賓斯克 (Mandarin Chinese*), Čheljabinsk – Չելյաբինսկ (Armenian*), Cheryabinsuku – チェリャビンスク (Japanese*), Çiläbe – Чиләбе (Kazan Tatar*),^{[KNAB]} Czelabińsk (Polish*),^{[KNAB]} Siläbe – Силәбе (Bashkir*),^{[KNAB]} Tankograd – Танкоград (Russian nickname during Soviet times*), Tcheliabinsk (French*),^{[KNAB]} Tšilīābinsk – تشيليابنسك (Arabic*), Tsjeljabinsk (Dutch*),^{[KNAB]} Tscheljabinsk (German*)
(Philippines) Cebu City	Sugbo (Cebuano, Waray), Sebu - セブ - (Japanese)
(China) Chengdu	Čengdu - Ченгду (Macedonian*), 成都 - Chéngdu (Mandarin Chinese), Chengdu - चेंगदू (Hindi), Chengtum (Latin), Chingdū - چېڭدۇ / Чеңду (Uighur), Chhengtu - ছেংতু (Bengali), Seito - 成都 [せいと] (Japanese), Seongdo - 성도 [成都] (Korean), Thành Đô (Vietnamese), چنگدو (Urdu), செங்குடு (Tamil),
(India) Chennai	Čenaj - Ченај or Čenai - Ченаи (Macedonian), Chennai - チェンナイ (Japanese), Madras (former name), Madràs (alternate in Catalan), Μάδρας (Greek), Madras - Мадрас (alternate in Macedonian), Mədrəs (alternate in Azerbaijani), চেন্নই (Bengali), ચેન્નઈ (Gujarati), चेन्नई (Hindi, Marathi), ಚೆನ್ನೈ (Kannada), சென்னை (Tamil), చెన్న పట్టణం (Telugu), ചെന്നൈ (Malayalam), Cannai - چنئی (Urdu), Mǎdélāsī - 马德拉斯 / 馬德拉斯 (Mandarin Chinese; simplified / traditional characters), Qīnnài - 钦奈 / 欽奈 (Mandarin Chinese; simplified / traditional characters), 첸나이 (Korean)
(Russia) Cheremkhovo	Arangata - Арангата (Buryat),^{[KNAB]} Čeremxovo - Черемхово (Macedonian, Russian),^{[KNAB]} Qièlièmǔhuòwò - 切列姆霍沃 (Mandarin Chinese), Seremhovo (Finnish), شیریم خووو (Urdu), செரெங்கோவோ (Tamil)
(Thailand) Chiang Mai	Chiang Mai - (English, French, Spanish, Portuguese), Čiang Mai - Чианг Маи or Čijang Maj - Чијанг Мај (Macedonian), เชียงใหม่ (Thai), 치앙마이 (Korean), Qīngmài - 清迈 / 清邁 (simplified and traditional Chinese) (Mandarin Chinese), (Tēsabānnakōn) Chenmai - (テーサバーンナコーン)チェンマイ (Japanese)
(Bangladesh) Chittagong	Jātjām / جاتجام (Modern Standard Arabic), Shatt Al-Ghānj / شط الغانج, Čitagong - Читагонг (Macedonian), Chatgaon / চাটগাঁও (Bengali), Chatgaon - चटगाँव (Hindi), (Chatgaon - چٹگاؤں (Urdu), Chātgām چاتگام (Persian), சிட்டகாங் (Tamil), Chatigão (Portuguese), Chittagon - チッタゴン (Japanese)
(China) Chongqing	Chhungchhing - ছুংছিং (Bengali), Chóngqìng - 重庆 / 重慶 (simplified and traditional Chinese), Chūngchīng - چۇڭچىڭ / Чуңчиң (Uyghur), Chunggyeong - 중경 [重慶] (Korean), Chungkina (Latin*), Chungqing (Dutch), Čungking - Чунгкинг (Macedonian), Jūkei - 重慶 [じゅうけい] (Japanese), Trùng Khánh (Vietnamese), చోంగ్కింగ్ (Telugu), چونگ چنگ (Urdu), சோங்கிங் (Tamil)

== D ==
English Name	Other names or former names
(Syria) Damascus	Dimašq - دمشق / Ash-Shām - الشام / Jilliq - جلق (Arabic), Şam (Kurdish), Damaskos - Δαμασκός (Greek), Dımeşk (obsolete Turkish), Damaskos - Դամասկոս, Šam - Շամ (Armenian), Dəməşq, Şam (Azerbaijani, Crimean Tatar, Turkish), Damas (French), Dammeseq - דַּמֶּשֶׂק (Hebrew), Damask - Дамаск (Russian, Bulgarian), Dimaşq˙ (Chechen), ¯Sam - Щам (Kabardian [Circassian]), Damesek (Karaim), Damasc (Catalan, Romanian), Damasco (Italian, Spanish, Portuguese), Damascus (Dutch, Latin, Scottish Gaelic, Welsh), Damasko (Esperanto), Damaskus (Danish, Estonian, Finnish, German, Indonesia, Norwegian), Damasku (Albanian, Maltese), Damask - Дамаск (Croatian, Macedonian, Serbian, Slovenian), Damaszkusz (Hungarian), Damašek (Czech), Damaszek (Polish), Damaskas (Lithuanian), Damaska (Latvian), Damaskos (Northern Lapp), Damaisc (Irish), Dimshek (Somali), Dameski (Swahili), Damashƙa (Hausa), Damaxk - دهمهشق (Uighur), Dàmǎshìgé - 大馬士革 (traditional characters) / 大马士革 (simplified characters) (Mandarin Chinese), Dímǐshí - 敵米石 (Ming dynasty era Chinese name), Damasukasu - ダマスカス (Japanese), Damaseukuseu - 다마스쿠스 (Korean), Damsyik (Malay), Damishk - दमिश्क (Hindi), Dameshk - দামেস্ক (Bengali), დამასკო (Georgian), Damišq دمشق (Persian, Urdu), ಡಮಾಸ್ಕಸ್ (Kannada), தமாசுக்கசு (Tamil)
(Vietnam) Da Nang	Đà Nẵng (Vietnamese), Danan - ダナン (Japanese), Da Nang - Да Нанг or Danang - Дананг (Macedonian*), Tourane (French [former]), Turan - Туран (Macedonian [former]), Xiàngǎng - 峴港 (traditional characters) 岘港 (simplified characters) (Mandarin Chinese), ڈا نانگ (Urdu), தனங்கு (Tamil)
(Bangladesh) Dhaka	Ḍhaka ঢাকা (Bengali, Assamese), ढाका (Hindi, Marathi), Ḍhākah ڈھاکہ (Urdu), داكا (Arabic, Persian), ઢાકા (Gujarati), Dacca (former English name until 1982, Italian, former Romanian, Spanish, alternate in Catalan and French), Dákǎ 達卡 (traditional characters) 达卡 (simplified characters) (Mandarin Chinese), Daka - Дака (Macedonian*), Dakka - Дакка (Russian), Dakka - ダッカ (Japanese), Dəkkə (Azerbaijani), Daca (Portuguese), დაკა (Georgian), ಢಾಕಾ (Kannada), டாக்கா (Tamil), Jahangirnagar (historic name)
(Timor-Leste) Dili	Dili (Indonesian*, Tetum), Díli (Portuguese*), Dili - Дили (Macedonian*), Dilly (archaic English), دیلی (Urdu), திலி (Tamil), Dìlì - 帝力 (Mandarin Chinese), Diri - ディリ (Japanese)
(Turkey) Diyarbakır	Diyar Bakr - ديار بكر (Arabic), Amida - ܐܡܝܕܐ (Syriac), Amid - Ամիդ (Armenian),^{[KNAB]} Amed - ئامه‌د (Kurdish), Amida (Latin),^{[KNAB]} Tigranakert - Տիգրանակերտ (Armenian),^{[KNAB]} Diarbakiri - დიარბაქირი (Georgian),^{[KNAB]} Dijarbakir - Дијарбакир or Dijarbekir - Дијарбекир (Macedonian*), Dijarbakyr - Диярбакыр (Russian),^{[KNAB]} Diyarbəkir (Azerbaijani), Diyarbakır (Turkish^{[KNAB]}), Diyarbekir (Kurdish alternative, historic Turkish [pre–1937]),^{[KNAB]} Diyarbekır (Zazaki), Diyar-ı Bekir - ديار بکر (Ottoman Turkish), Kara Âmid - قره آمد (Ottoman Turkish), دیار باکر (Urdu), தியார்பேக்கிர் (Tamil)
(Tajikistan) Dushanbe	Djušambe - Дюшамбе (historic Russian [pre–1929], Doesjanbe (Dutch*, Afrikaans*), Döšembe - Дюшембе (Lak),^{[KNAB]} Douchanbé (French),^{[KNAB]} Duchambe (Spanish),^{[KNAB]} Duchambé (Portuguese),^{[KNAB]} Dūchānbē - ดูชานเบ (Thai)*, Duixanbe (Catalan), Duśāmbai - दुशांबे (Hindi), Duśambai - दुशंबे (Hindi),^{[KNAB]} Dusambé (Spanish), Düşämbe - Дүшәмбе (Tatar, Bashkir),^{[KNAB]} Duśānbai - दुशान्बे (Hindi)*, Dusanbe (Hungarian)*,^{[KNAB]} Dušanbe (Croatian, Latvian, Slovak, Slovenian), Dušanbe - Душанбе (Bulgarian*, Russian*,^{[KNAB]} Macedonian*, Serbian*), Dušanbe - Душанбе - دوشنبه (Tajik)*, Dušanbe - დუშანბე (Georgian)*, Dušanbe - Դուշանբե (Armenian)*, Dušanbė (Lithuanian)*,^{[KNAB]} Duşanbe (Turkish)*, Duşanbe - Душанбе (Kazakh)*, Dușanbe (Romanian), Duşanbe-qurƣon - Душанбе-қурғон - دوشنبه قورغان (historic Tajik), Düşənbə (Azerbaijani)*,^{[KNAB]} Duŝanbeo (Esperanto), Duschanbe (German),^{[KNAB]} Duşenbe (Kurdish)*, Duşenbe - Душенбе (Turkmen),^{[KNAB]} Düşenbe (Turkish),^{[KNAB]} Dushambe - ドゥシャンベ (Japanese)*, Dūshanbah - دوشنبة (Arabic),^{[KNAB]} Dushanbe - Душанбе (Karakalpak*, Uzbek*), Dushanbe - דושאנבע (Yiddish)*, Dùshàngbié - 杜尚別 (Mandarin Chinese)*,^{[KNAB]} Düshenbe - دۈشەنبە - Дүшәнбә (Uyghur),^{[KNAB]} Dusjanbe (Danish*, Swedish*), Dusyanbe - 두샨베 (Korean)*, Duszanbe (Polish)*,^{[KNAB]} Düyşömbü - Дүйшөмбү (Kyrgyz),^{[KNAB]} Dyushambe (historic English [pre–1929]), Hissar (historic name), Shǐdálínnàbādé - 史達林納巴德 (historic Mandarin Chinese [1929–1964]), Stalinabad (historic English [1929–1964]), Stalinabad - Сталинабад (historic Russian [1929–1964]), St'alinabadi - სტალინაბადი (historic Georgian [1929–1964]), Stalinobod - Сталинобод - ستالینآباد (historic Tajik [1929–1964]), دوشنبہ (Urdu)*, دوشنبه (Pashto)*, Ντουσαμπέ (Greek)*, ದುಶಾನ್ಬೆ (Kannada), துசன்பே (Tamil)

== E ==
English Name	Other names or former names
(Turkey) Elazığ	Elazığ (Azerbaijani, Turkish alternative), Elâzığ (Turkish),^{[KNAB]} Elazig - Елазиг (Macedonian*), Elazıı - (Gagauz), Elazık (historic Turkish, 1937), Elâzîz (Turkish, pre–1937), Elezîz - (Kurdish), Èljazyg - Элязыг (Russian),^{[KNAB]} Elyazik‘ - Էլյազիք (Armenian alternative),^{[KNAB]} Ḥarfūṭ - ܟܪܦܘܬ (Syriac), Mamuretülaziz (Turkish, 1866–?), Mezra (Kurdish alternative), Xarberd - Խարբերդ (Armenian), Xarpêt (Kurdish alternative, Zazaki), Xarpıt (Zazaki alternative), Xarpiyêt (Zazaki alternative), Xarpût (Kurdish alternative), الازیغ (Urdu), எலாசிக்கு (Tamil)
(Kurdistan Region) Erbil	^{[KNAB]} Hewlêr - ھەولێر (Kurdish), Arbaelo - ܐܪܒܝܠ (Syriac), Arbela (Latin), Arbīl - اربيل (Arabic),^{[KNAB]} Ərbil (Azerbaijani), Erbil (Turkish), Erbil - Ербил (Macedonian), Èrbilʼ - Эрбиль (Russian),^{[KNAB]} Irbīl - اربيل (Arabic alternative)^{[KNAB]}, اربيل (Urdu), எர்பில் (Tamil), Arbil - আর্বিল (Bengali)
(Turkey) Erzurum	Eruzurum - Ерзурум (Macedonian*), Eruzurumu - エルズルム (Japanese) also written as Erzerum or Erzeroum in some texts until the early 20th century, formerly known as Arzen during the Roman period, Theodosiopolis (after Theodosius I) during the Byzantine period and Karin (Կարին) in Armenian (hence Karnu-kalaki, კარნუ-ქალაქი, of the medieval Georgians), ارض روم (Urdu), எர்சுரும் (Tamil)
(Turkey) Eskişehir	Əskişəhər (Azerbaijani), Dorylaeum (Latin), Esquiceir (Portuguese), İskeşähär - Искешәһәр (Tatar), Āisījīxièxīěr - 埃斯基谢希尔 (Chinese), Eskisechír - Εσκισεχίρ (Greek), Dorylaion - Δορύλαιον (Former Greek)

== F ==
English Name	Other names or former names
(Pakistan) Faisalabad	Faisarābādo - ファイサラーバード (Japanese), فیصل آباد (Urdu), Faysalabad (Turkish), ஃபைசலாபாத் (Tamil), Foysolabad - ফয়সলাবাদ (Bengali), لائل پور (historic Urdu), Lyallpur (historic English changed to Faisalabad in 1977)
(Japan) Fukuoka	Hok-kong - 福岡 (Southern Min), Dazaifu - 大宰府 (former Japanese), Phukuoka - फुकुओका (Hindi), Ḥpukuyōkā - புகுயோகா (Tamil), Phukuvēāka - ഫുകുവോക (Malayalam), Fukōkā - ෆුකෝකා (Sinhala), Hukuoka - 후쿠오카 (Korean), Fwkwoka - Фукуока (Kazakh), Phuku’ōkā - ફુકુઓકા (Gujarati), Fúgāng - 福冈 (Chinese)
(China) Fushun	Fouchouen (French), Fuxi - 撫西 (alternate Chinese), Bú-sūn (Southern Min), Ū-sông (Eastern Min), Phủ Thuận (Vietnamese)
(China) Fuzhou	Focheum (Latin*), Fūkjāu - 福州 (Cantonese), Fukushū - 福州 (Japanese), Fuzhou - 福州 (Mandarin), Pjuwk Tsyuw - 福州 (Middle Chinese)

== G ==
English Name	Other names or former names
(Turkey) Gallipoli	Galipole - Галиполе (Macedonian), Galipoli - גליפולי (Hebrew)*, Galipolis (Lithuanian)*, Galipolje (Croatian*, Serbian*), Gallipoli (Dutch*, Finnish*, French*, German*, Italian*, Romanian*), Gallipolli / Kallip'olli - 갈리폴리 (Korean), Gal·lípoli (Catalan), Gelibolu (Turkish)*, Kallípolis - Καλλίπολις (Greek)*, گیلی بولو (Urdu), கல்லிபோலி (Tamil)
(Azerbaijan) Ganja	Elisabethpol (former German), Elisávetpoli - Ελισάβετπολη (former Greek), Elizavetpol' - Елизаветполь (former Russian), Gandja (Catalan*, Danish*, French*, Portuguese*, Spanish*), Gandscha (German)*, Gandža (Estonian*, Finnish*, Lithuanian*), Gandža - Ганџа (Macedonian), Gandžā (Latvian*), Gandża (Polish)*, Gandzak - Գանձակ (Armenian)*, Ganzha - Ганжа (former Russian), Gandzja (Dutch)*, Gandzsá (Hungarian*), Ganga - ܓܢܓܐ (Syriac), Gangia (Italian)*, Ganja - განჯა (Georgian)*, Ganja - גנג׳ה (Hebrew), Ganjeh - گنجه (Persian)*, Ghianja (Romanian*), Gjandža - Гјанџа (Serbian)*, Gyandzha - Гянджа (Belarusian*, Bulgarian*, Russian*, Ukrainian*), Gəncə [Ҝәнҹә] (Azerbaijani)*, Gence - گنجه (Kurdish)*, Gence (Turkish)*, Giantzá - Γκιαντζά (Greek)*, Janzā - جنزا (Arabic*), Kirovabad - Кировабад (former Russian), گانجا (Urdu), கஞ்சா (Tamil)
(China) Guangzhou	Canton (English [historic/alternate], Catalan, French, Welsh, Italian, Romanian), Cantão (Portuguese), Cantón (Spanish), *, Cantonia (Latin) Gwóngjàu - 广州 / 廣州 (Cantonese), Gwangju - 광주 [廣州] (Korean), Guangdžou - Гуангџоу (Macedonian), Guǎngzhōu - 广州 (simplified characters) / 廣州 (traditional characters) (Mandarin Chinese), Kńg-chiu - 广州 / 廣州 (Minnan / Taiwanese), Guōng-ciŭ - 广州 / 廣州 (Mindong), Gvangjcouh (Zhuang), Kanton / Guangzhou (German), Kanton (Dutch, Finnish Polish, Turkish), Kantona - Καντόνα (Greek), Kōshū - 広州 [こうしゅう] (Japanese), Quảng Châu (Vietnamese), กวางเจา (Thai), გუანჯოუ, კანტონი (Georgian), گوانگ ژو (Urdu), குவாங்சு (Tamil), Kuyangchou - কুয়াংচৌ (Bengali), Quancheum (Latin*), ಗುವಾಂಗ್ಝೌ (Kannada)
(China) Guiyang	Queiyanga (Latin*)

== H ==
English Name	Other names or former names
(Israel) Haifa	Caifa / Caiphas (former medieval crusader names, Italian), Haïfa (French), Haifa - ハイファ (Japanese), Chaifa - Χάιφα (Greek), Haifa (English, Spanish, German, Portuguese, Italian), Haifa - Хаифа (Macedonian*), Hǎifǎ - 海法 (traditional and simplified characters) (Mandarin Chinese), Haipa - ჰაიფა (Georgian), Hajfa (Polish), Ḥayfā - حيفا (Arabic), Hayfa (Turkish, Azerbaijani), Ḥáyfa - חיפה (Hebrew), Sycaminon / Sykaminos (other names [archaic]), ܚܝܦܐ (Syriac), Ḥaifā - حيفا - (Urdu), ஐபா (Tamil), Khayfa - Хайфа (Russian, Ukrainian), Hāifā - हाइफ़ा (Hindi), Haipa - 하이파 (Korean)
(China) Hangzhou	Hancheum (Latin*), Hangzhou - 杭州 (Mandarin)
(Vietnam) Hanoi	Hénèi - 河内 (Mandarin Chinese), Hanoi - ハノイ (Japanese), Hanoj - Ханој (Macedonian*), 하노이 (Korean), هانوي (Arabic), Khanoy/Khanoj - Ханой (Russian), Hà Nội(Vietnamese), ಹನೋಯಿ (Kannada)
(China) Harbin	Cáp Nhĩ Tân (Vietnamese), Charmpin - Χαρμπίν (Greek), Ha-eolbin - 하얼빈 (Korean), Hā'ěrbīn - 哈尔滨/哈爾濱 (simplified and traditional characters) (Mandarin Chinese), Harbin (English, Spanish, French, Portuguese), Harbin - Харбин (Macedonian), Harbinia (Latin), Harubin - ハルビン (Japanese), Kharbin - Харбин (Russian, Mongolian
(Palestine) Hebron	Al-Khalīl - الخليل (Arabic), Əl Xəlil (Azerbaijani), Chevrón(a) - Χεβρών(α) (Greek), El-Halil (Turkish), Halilürrahman (Ottoman Turkish), Ḥeḇrôn - חֶבְרוֹן (Hebrew [Tiberian]) Hebron (Catalan, English, Scottish Gaelic), Hebrón (Spanish), Hebron - Хеброн (Macedonian), Hebroni - ჰებრონი (Georgian), Heburon - ヘブロン (Japanese), Ḥevron - חֶבְרוֹן (Hebrew [Standard]), Kiryat-Arba - קִרְיַת־(הְ)אַרְבַּע (ancient Hebrew),^{[KNAB]} Xībólún - 希伯侖 / 希伯倫 / 希伯崙 (Mandarin Chinese), الخليل (Urdu), எபுரான் (Tamil), Al-Kholil - আল-খলিল (Bengali)
(Japan) Hiroshima	Guāngdǎo - 广岛 / 廣島 (simplified and traditional characters) (Mandarin Chinese), Hiroshima - 히로시마 (Korean), Hirošima - Хирошима (Macedonian*), Khirosima - Хиросима (Russian), Thành phố Hiroshima (Vietnamese), Hiroşima (Turkish), இரோசிமா (Tamil)
(Vietnam) Ho Chi Minh City	Gajeong - 嘉定 (archaic Korean), Gia Ðịnh - 嘉定 (archaic Vietnamese), Ho Ši Min - Хо Ши Мин (Macedonian*), Hōchimin - ホーチミン (Japanese), Nakhone hôchimin - ນະຄອນໂຮ່ຈີມິນ (Lao),^{[KNAB]}, Ho Chi Minh-Stad (Dutch), Hošiminas (Lithuanian), Ho Si Min Város (Hungarian), Ho Și Min (Romanian), Ho Ši Mini - ჰო ში მინი (Georgian), Ho Tsji Ming-Stad (former Dutch), Hú Zhìmíng Shì - 胡志明市 (Mandarin Chinese), Jiādìng - 嘉定 (Classical Chinese), Katei - 嘉定 (archaic Japanese), Nakhǭn Hōčhimin - นครโฮจิมินห์ (Thai),^{[KNAB]} Ô͘ Chì-bêng Chhī 胡志明市 (Taiwanese), Prey Nôkôr - ព្រៃនគរ (Khmer),^{[KNAB]} Sài Gòn (former Vietnamese), Saigon (former English, Catalan, Italian, former Romanian), Saigón (Spanish), Sāigung - 西貢 (former Cantonese), Sai-kòng - 西貢 (former Taiwanese), Sainggônmyo - ဆိုင်ဂုံမြို့ (Burmese),^{[KNAB]} Saingǭn - ไซ่ง่อน (former Thai), Sajgon - Сајгон (former Macedonian), ^{[KNAB]} Thành Phố Hồ Chí Minh (Vietnamese),^{[KNAB]} Wùh Jimìhng Síh - 胡志明市 (Cantonese), Xaingon - ໄຊງ່ອນ (former Lao),^{[KNAB]} Xīgòng - 西貢 (former Mandarin Chinese), ھوچی من شہر (Urdu), ಹೋ ಚಿ ಮಿನ್ಹ್ ನಗರ (Kannada), ஓ சி மின் நகரம் (Tamil), Baigaur (Cham)
(China) Hohhot	Fufuhoto - フフホト (Japanese), Hohhotum (Latin) Hohot - Хохот (Macedonian), Hūhéhàotè - 呼和浩特 (Mandarin Chinese), Huheo Hao Teo - 후허 하오 터 (Korean), Khukh-khoto - Хух-Хото (Russian), Khökh khot - Хөх хот (Mongolian), Chochot - Χοχότ (Greek)
Hong Kong	Chongk Kongk - Χονγκ Κονγκ (Greek), Hāńgkāńg - हांगकांग (Hindi),^{[KNAB]} Hańkań - হংকং (Bengali),^{[KNAB]} Hēunggóng - 香港 (Cantonese), Hiong-káng - 香港 (Minnan, Taiwanese), Hiông-kóng - 香港 (Hakka), Hong Cong (Irish, Scottish Gaelic), Hongcongum (Latin*), Hong Kong - 홍콩 (Korean alternate), Hong Kong (English), Hоngkong - Хонгконг (Macedonian*), Hǭngkong - ฮ่องกง (Thai), Honkon - ホンコン / 香港 (Japanese), Honkong - Хонконг (Mongolian), Honkongo (Esperanto), * Hương Cảng or Hồng Công (Vietnamese), Hyanghang - 향항 / 香港 (Korean), Shanggang - ཤང་ཀང (Tibetan),^{[KNAB]}, Siamkiamum (Latin), Victoria (obsolete, colonial name of the city on the north shore of Hong Kong Island), Xianggang - 香港 (traditional and simplified characters) (Mandarin Chinese), Yanghgangj (Zhuang), Hong Ķongi - ჰონგ კონგი (Georgian), ھونگ کونگ (Urdu), ಹಾಂಗ್ ಕಾಂಗ್ (Kannada), ஆங்காங்கு (Tamil), Hónggóng -ຫ້ອງກົງ (Lao)
(India) (Pakistan) Hyderabad	Aitarāpāt - ஐதராபாத் (Tamil),^{[KNAB]} Aitarāpāttu - ஐதராபாத்து (Tamil), Haidarābād - हैदराबाद (Hindi, Marathi),^{[KNAB]} Haidar ābād - حیدر آباد (Urdu, Farsi), Haidarābād - ഹൈദരാബാദ് (Malayalam),^{[KNAB]} Haidarabadi - ჰაიდარაბადი (Georgian), Haidarābāda - ಹೈದರಾಬಾದ (Kannada) ^{[KNAB]} / ಹೇದರಾಬಾದ್ (Kannada), Haidarābādu - హైదరాబాదు (Telugu),^{[KNAB]} Haiderabādo - ハイデラバード (Japanese), Haidœ̄rābāt - ไฮเดอราบาด (Thai), Haidrābādu - హైద్రాబాదు (alternative Telugu),^{[KNAB]} Haidrarābād - હૈદ્રરાબાદ (Gujarati),^{[KNAB]} Haitarāpāt - னைதராபாத் (Tamil),^{[KNAB]} Hajderabad - Хајдерабад (Macedonian), Haydarabad (Turkish*), Haydorābād - হায়দরাবাদ (Bengali),^{[KNAB]}

== I ==
English Name	Other names or former names
(Russia) Irkutsk	Erhüü - Эрхүү (Buryat and Mongolian), Ircutsque (Rare Portuguese), Irkutsk - Иркутск (Macedonian, Russian), Irkuțk (Romanian), Irkoutsk (French), Irkutsk (English, Portuguese), Irukūtsuku - イルクーツク (Japanese), Yìěrkùcīkè - 伊爾庫茨克 (traditional characters) 伊尔库茨克 (simplified characters) (Chinese), Irkuck (Polish), ირკუტსკი (Georgian), ارکوتسک (Urdu), İrkutsk (Turkish*), இருக்குட்டசுக்கு (Tamil)
(Iran) Isfahan	Aspadana (Ancient Greek); Esfahān - اصفهان (Persian*); Isbahan (Arabic); Gabae, Jay, Sepahan, Yahudiyya (ancient); Esfahan, Hispahan, Ispahan, Ispahan - ইস্পাহান (Bengali), İsfahan (Turkish*) Further information (in Persian): Names of Isfahan
(Turkey) İskenderun	Alejandría (Spanish), Aleksandretta (Polish), Alessandretta (Italian), Alexandreta (Portuguese), Alexandretta (variant in English, German), Alexandrétta - Αλεξανδρέττα (Greek), Alexandria - Αλεξάνδρια (Greek), Alexandrette (variant in French, German), Alexandria (Romanian), Alexandrie* (Czech), Alexandrië (Dutch), Iskandarūn - إسكندرون (Arabic), (al-)Iskandariya (former Arabic), İskenderiye (Turkish until 1939), İskenderun (Turkish), Iskenderun - Искендерун or Aleksandreta - Александрета (Macedonian), İsgəndərun (Azerbaijani), Scanderoon (former variant in English), Isukenderun - イスケンデルン (Japanese), ისქანდერუნი (Georgian), اسكندرون (Urdu), இசுகெந்தரன் (Tamil)
(Turkey) Istanbul	Carigrad - Цариград / Konstantinopol - Константинопол / Stambol - Стамбол (former Macedonian*), Constantinopla (historic Spanish), Constantinopolis (Latin, Middle English) Estambul (Spanish), Istamboul (French alternative), İstanbul (Turkish), Isutanbūru - イスタンブール (Japanese), Istambul (Portuguese), Isztanbul (Hungarian), Stambul (former Romanian), Stambuł (Polish), Țarigrad (former Romanian), Konstantinopel (Swedish), Miklagarðr (Old Norse), Ыстамбұл (Kazakh), استنبول (Urdu), ಇಸ್ತಾಂಬುಲ್ (Kannada), இசுதான்புல் (Tamil)
(Turkey) İzmir	Esmirna (Catalan, Portuguese, Spanish), Ezmirna (Ladino), Ijeumireu - 이즈미르 (Korean), İzmir (Turkish, Azerbaijani), Izmir (Dutch, Hungarian, Romanian), Izmir - Измир (Macedonian*, Russian*, Serbian), Izmira (Latvian), Izumiru - イズミル (Japanese), Smiorna (Irish), Smirna (former Romanian), Smirna - Смирна (former Macedonian, former Serbian), Smirne (Italian), Żmirna (Maltese), Smýrni - Σμύρνη (Greek), Smyrna (Latin, Polish, variant in English), Szmirna (historic Hungarian), იზმირი (Georgian), Զմիւռնիա or Իզմիր (Armenian /Zmyurnia or Izmiř/), Yīzīmìěr 伊兹密尔 / 伊茲密爾 (Mandarin Chinese)*, Zmyrna (Latin variant), ازمیر (Urdu), இசுமீர் (Tamil)

== J ==
English Name	Other names or former names
Jaffna	யாழ்ப்பாணம் (Tamil) also யாழ்ப்பாண பட்டினம் (Tamil)
(India) Jaipur	जयपुर (Hindi), જયપુર (Gujarati), जयपूर (Marathi), جئے پور (Punjabi - Shahmukhi/Urdu), ਜੈਪੁਰ (Punjabi - Gurmukhi), জয়পুর (Bengali), ଜୟପୁର (Odisha), ಜೈಪುರ (Kannada), செய்ப்பூர் (Tamil), జైపూర్ (Telugu), 齋浦爾 (Mandarain Chinese), ജയ്‌പൂർ (Malayalam), Джайпур (Russian), Jaipur (Dutch, English, French, German, Italian, Portuguese, Spanish)
(Indonesia) Jakarta	Batavia (Dutch colonial name), Betawi (former Malay, former Indonesian), Sunda Kelapa (original native name), Cakarta (Turkish), Djakarta (Dutch alternate, French, German, Romanian), Dzhakarta - Джакарта (Russian, Ukrainian), Džakarta (Croatian), Džakarta - Џакарта (Macedonian*, Serbian), Dżakarta (Polish), Dzsakarta (Hungarian), Giacarta (Italian), Ġakarta (Maltese), Iacárta (Irish), Jacarta (Portuguese), Jakaruta - ジャカルタ (Japanese), Jakareuta - 자카르타 (Korean), Jagatara - ジャガタラ (Japanese [archaic]), Τζακάρτα (Greek), ჯაკარტა (Georgian), Yǎjiādá - 雅加达 / 雅加達 (Mandarin Chinese; simplified / traditional characters), Yakarta (Spanish), जकार्ता (Hindi), ಜಕಾರ್ತಾ (Kannada), சகார்த்தா (Tamil), Yéjiādá - 耶加達 / 椰加達 (Mandarin Chinese)
(Palestine) Jericho	Arīħa, أريحا (Arabic, Persian), Areeha - আরীহা (Bengali), Eriha, Ceriko (Turkish), Erihon - Ерихон (Macedonian), Gerico (Italian), Iaireikō - 𐌹𐌰𐌹𐍂𐌴𐌹𐌺𐍉 (Gothic), Iericho (Scottish Gaelic), Iericho - Ιεριχώ (Greek), Ierihon (Romanian), Ierikhon - Иерихон (Russian), Ierikoni - იერიქონი (Georgian), Ireachó (Irish), Jeeriko (Estonian), Jerichas (Lithuanian), Jericho (Czech, Dutch, German, Slovak), Jéricho (French), Jericó (Catalan, Spanish, Portuguese), Ġeriko (Maltese), Jerihon (Croatian), Jerihon - Йерихон (Bulgarian), Jerihon - Јерихон (Serbian), Jērika (Latvian), Jeriko (Danish, Finnish, Norwegian, Swedish), Jerikó (Hungarian), Jerycho (Polish) Jerykhon - Єрихон (Ukrainian), Yariho - यरीहो (Hindi), Yeriḥo - יְרִיחוֹ (Hebrew), Yeriko - イェリコ (Japanese), Yeriko - 예리코 (Korean), Yerikʿov - Երիքով (Armenian), جریکو (Urdu), செரிச்சோ (Tamil), Jiélǐkē - 杰里科 / 傑里科 (Mandarin Chinese; simplified/traditional characters - modern name), Yēlìgē - 耶利哥 (Mandarin Chinese - biblical name)
(Saudi Arabia) Jeddah	جدّة - Jiddah (Arabic), Cidde (Turkish), Dschidda (German), Jedda - जेद्दा (Hindi), Djedda (Dutch), Djeddah (French), Džeda - Џеда (Macedonian*), Jedda (Spanish, Finnish), Jedda/Jidda - ジェッダ/ジッダ (Japanese), Gedda (Italian), Gidda (Catalan), Jidá (Portuguese), Ciddə (Azerbaijani), Dżudda (Polish), Džida (Lithuanian), Yidda (Spanish var.), ჯედა (Georgian), جدہ (Urdu), சித்தா (Tamil), Jedda - জেদ্দা (Bengali)
(Israel) (Palestine) Jerusalem	Baitul Maqdis (Malays), Erusalim - Ерусалим (Macedonian*), Erusaremu - エルサレム (Japanese), Gerusalemme (Italian), Ġerusalemm (Maltese), Giêrusalem (Vietnamese), Giê-ru-xa-lem (former Vietnamese), Hierusalem (Latin, Old English), Hierosolyma (Alternative Latin), Hiruharama (Maori), Iairusalēm - 𐌹𐌰𐌹𐍂𐌿𐍃𐌰𐌻𐌴𐌼 or Iairusaulwma - 𐌹𐌰𐌹𐍂𐌿𐍃𐌰𐌿𐌻𐍅𐌼𐌰 (Gothic), Iarúsailéim (Irish), Ielukalema (Hawaiian), Ierusalem (Scottish Gaelic), Ierusalim (Romanian), Ierusalím - Ιερουσαλήμ or Ierosólima - Ιεροσόλυμα (Greek), Ierusalimi - იერუსალიმი (Georgian), Ierusalim - Иерусалим (Ossetian, Russian), Jerozolima (Polish), Jerusalem (Catalan, Danish, Finnish, German, Norwegian, Swedish), Jérusalem (French), Jerúsalem, Jórsalir or Jórsalaborg (Icelandic, Old Norse), Jerusalém (Portuguese), Jerusalén (Spanish), Jerusalim - Йерусалим (Bulgarian), Jerusalim - Јерусалим (Serbian), Jerusalým - Єрусалим (Ukrainian), Jeruusalemm (Estonian), Jeruzalem (Croatian, Dutch, Polish (old), Slovak, Slovene), Jeruzalém (Czech), Jeruzalė (Lithuanian), Jeruzāleme (Latvian), Jeruzsálem^{IW} (Hungarian), Jherusalem (Old French), Kudüs (Turkish), Orshalim - اورشلیم (Persian), al-Quds - القُدس / القـُدْس (Arabic), Quds (Kurdish), Quddus (Uzbek), Rwšꜣlmm or ꜣwšꜣmm (Middle Egyptian), Urusalim (Late Egyptian), Xerusalén (Asturian, Galician) Yarushalem - यरूशलेम (Hindi), Yēlùsālěng - 耶路撒冷^{IW} (Mandarin Chinese), Yerusalam (Indonesian), Yerusałem - Երուսաղեմ (Armenian), Yerusəlim (Azerbaijani), Yerusallem - 예루살렘 (Korean), Yerushaláyim - יְרוּשָׁלַיִם (Hebrew), Yərûšəlem - יְרוּשְׁלֶם (Aramaic), እየሩሳሌም (Amharic); Former names: Jorsal (Old Norse), یروشلم (Urdu), செருசலேம் (Tamil), Kudus - কুদুস (Bengali), ಜೆರುಸಲೇಮ್ (Kannada), Ūrišlem - ܐܘܪܫܠܡ (Syriac)

== K ==
English Name	Other names or former names
(Pakistan) Karachi	ڪراچي (Sindhi), كراچى (Urdu, Punjabi) Karachi - カラチ (Japanese), कराची (Hindi), Karaçi (Turkish), Karači - Карачи (Macedonian), Karaczi (Polish), Kəraçi (Azerbaijani), ყარაჩი (Georgian), Kǎlāqí - 卡拉奇 (Mandarin Chinese); Former name: Kolachi (early 19th century name), கராச்சி (Tamil), Korachī - করাচী (Bengali), ಕರಾಚಿ (Kannada)
(Turkey) Kayseri	Caesarea (Latin), Kaiseri - カイセリ (Japanese), Kaјseri - Кајсери (Macedonian*), Kayseri (Turkish), Qeysəriyyə (Azerbaijani); Former names: Cäsarea (German), Caesarea (English), Cesarea (Italian), Kaisáreia - Καισάρεια (Greek), Mazaca (ancient name in Latin), Mazaka (ancient name in Greek), کیسری (Urdu), கைசேரி (Tamil)
(Iran) Kerman	Bardsir, Bardašir, Govāšir (Ancient); كرمان (Persian)
(Iran) Kermanshah	Bākhtarān (historic Persian), Ghahramanshahr (historic Persian), Kermanšah - Керманшах (Macedonian*), Kirmanşah (Turkish), Kerumānshā - ケルマーンシャー (Japanese), Kirmaşan (Kurdish), کرمانشاه (Persian), کرمان شاہ (Urdu), கெர்மான்சா (Tamil)
(Russia) Khabarovsk	Bólì - 伯力 (alternative name in Chinese), Chabarowsk (Polish), Hābāluófūsīkè - 哈巴罗夫斯克 (Chinese), Habarobseukeu - 하바롭스크 (Korean), Habarofusuku - ハバロフスク (Japanese), Habarovsk - Хабаровск (Macedonian), خباروسکی (Urdu), கபரோவசுக்கு (Tamil)
(India) Kolkata	Calcuta (Catalan, Romanian, Spanish), Calcúta (Irish), Calcutá (Portuguese), Calcutta (Danish, Italian, Norwegian, Swedish), Jiā'ěrgèdá - 加爾各答 (Mandarin Chinese (traditional characters)), Kalkoúta - Καλκούτα (Greek), Kalkuta (Serbian, Polish), Kalküta (Turkish), Kalkuta - Калкута (former Macedonian), Kalkutta (Finnish, German), Kalʼkutta - Калькутта (Russian), Kəlküttə (Azerbaijani), Ka-ní-kok-tap - 加爾各答 (Hokkien/Taiwanese), Korukata - コルカタ (Japanese), Kolkata/Kolikata কলকাতা / কলিকাতা (Bengali), კალკუტა (Georgian), कोलकाता (Hindi, current), कलकत्ता (Hindi, traditional), ಕಲ್ಕತ್ತಾ (Kannada), കൊല്ക്കത്ത (Malayalam), கொல்கத்தா (Tamil); Former name: Calcutta (English, French), kalkattah کلکتہ (Urdu), Kolkata- Колката (Macedonian*), Karukatta - カルカッタ (Japanese)
(Malaysia) Kota Kinabalu	Kotakinabaru - コタキナバル (Japanese), Kota Kinabalu - Кота Кинабалу (Macedonian*); Former names: Api (colonial Japanese name), A-pì - 亞庇 (Hokkien), Api-Api (former Malay), Jesselton (colonial English name), Yàbì - 亞庇 (Mandarin Chinese [traditional]), کوٹا کنا بالو (Urdu), கோத்தா கினபாலு (Tamil)
(Malaysia) Kuala Lumpur	Jílóngpō - 吉隆坡 (Mandarin Chinese), Kouala Loumpou (Créole), Kúala Lúmpúr (Icelandic), Kuala Lumpur - Куала Лумпур (Macedonian*), Kuala-Lumpur - Куала-Лумпур (Russian, Ukrainian), Kuala-Lumpuro (Esperanto), Kuararumpūru - クアラルンプール (Japanese), Kvala Lumpūras (Lithuanian), კუალა ლუმპური (Georgian), கோலாலம்பூர் (Tamil), کوالا لومپور (Urdu)
Kuwait City	Former names: Al-Kuwayt, Al Quaat, Graen, Grain, Grane, Grave, Koweit, Kuwet, Kuweit, Quade, Qurein, مدينة الكويت (Arabic) Cathair Chuibhèit (Scottish Gaelic), Ciudad de Kuwait (Spanish), Kuvajt - Кувајт (Macedonian*), Kuvajto (Esperanto), குவைத்து நகரம் (Tamil)
(Japan) Kyoto	Gyeongdo - 경도 [京都] (Korean), Gyoto - 교토 (Korean), Jīngdū - 京都 (Mandarin Chinese (traditional and simplified characters)), Kiaⁿ-to͘ - 京都 (Hokkien/Taiwanese*), Kioto (Afrikaans, Basque, Dutch, Esperanto, Finnish, Polish, Spanish), Киото (Russian), Kijotas (Lithuanian), Kjoto - Кјото (Macedonian*), Kyōto - 京都 [きょうと] (Japanese*), Quioto (Galician, Portuguese), کیو تو (Urdu), ಕ್ಯೋತೋ (Kannada), கியோத்தோ (Tamil),
(Russia) Kyzyl	Belocarsk - Белоцарск (Russian [pre-1918]),^{[KNAB]} Belotsarsk (English [pre-1918]), Kěnmùbìqíěr - 肯木畢其爾 (Mandarin Chinese [Taiwan usage]), Kèzīlēi - 克孜勒 (Mandarin Chinese* (traditional and simplified characters)), Khem Belder (English [1918-1926]), Kijil - 키질 (Korean*), Kijil Qota - ᠬᠢᠵᠢᠯ ᠬᠣᠲᠠ (Classical Mongolian), Kizil - Кизил (Macedonian, Mongolian^{[KNAB]}), Kīzīl - كيزيل (Arabic*), Kızıl (Turkish*), Kizil Khoto (obsolete English variant), Kizila - किज़िल (Hindi*), Krasnyj - Красный (Russian [unofficial variant 1920-1926]),^{[KNAB]} Kyzyl (English, French*, Spanish*), Kyzyl - Кызыл (Belarusian*, Buryat, Mongolian*, Russian*, Yakut), Kyzyl - Кизил (Ukrainian*), Kyzyl-Khoto (former English variant), Kuzuru - クズル (Japanese*), Qızıl - Қызыл (Kazakh*), Qizil - قىزىل (Uyghur),^{[KNAB]} Qızıl - Кызыл (Tatar*), Qıźıl - Ҡыҙыл (Bashkir),^{[KNAB]} Qyzyl - Къызыл (Karachay-Balkar,^{[KNAB]} Kumyk^{[KNAB]}), Urjanxajsk - Урянхайск (Russian [unofficial variant 1918-1920]), Xem Beldiri - Хем Белдири (Tuvan [1918-1926]),^{[KNAB]} Xem-Beldyr - Хем-Белдыр (Russian [1918-1926])^{[KNAB]}, قزل (Urdu), கிசில் (Tamil)

== L ==
English Name	Other names or former names
(Pakistan) Lahore	لاہور (Urdu), لہور (Punjabi), लाहौर (Hindi), লাহোর (Bengali), ლაჰორი (Georgian), Λαχώρης (Greek), ละฮ อร์ (Thai), לאַכאָ (Yiddish), Lahor (Turkish*), Laxor - Лахор (Ukrainian), లాహోర్ (Telugu), ಲಾಹೋರ್ (Kannada), லாகூர் (Tamil), Լահոր (Armenian), Láhaur (Slovak), લાહોર (Gujrati), 拉合尔 (simplified characters), 拉合爾 (traditional characters) (Mandarin Chinese), Láhaur (Czech), Lahor - Лахор (Macedonian*), Lakhor - Лахор (Russian), Lahore (English, French, Italian, Portuguese, Spanish, Latin, Estonian, Filipino, Finnish, Dutch, Danish, German, Croatian, Irish), Laore (Portuguese*), लहोरे (Nepali), ラホール (Japanese), Raholleu - 라호르 (Korean)
(Philippines) Legazpi	Legazpi (English, Bikol, Cebuano, Ilokano, Kapampangan, Spanish, Tagalog), Regasupi - レガスピ (Japanese)
(China) Lhasa	Lhasa (English, French, Spanish, German, Italian, Portuguese), Lhāsa - ल्हासा (Hindi), Lāsà - 拉萨 / 拉薩 (simplified and traditional characters) (Mandarin Chinese), Rasa - ラサ (Japanese), Lasa - 라사 (Korean), Lasa - Ласа (Macedonian), Lkhasa - Лхаса (Russian)
(India) Lucknow	लखनऊ (Hindi), লখনউ (Bengali), لکھنؤ (Urdu, Punjabi - Shahmukhi), ਲਖਨਊ (Punjabi - Gurmukhi), લખનૌ (Gujarati), ಲಕ್ನೋ (Kannada), ଲକ୍ଷ୍ନୌ (Odisha), இலக்னோ (Tamil), Лакхнау (Russian), Lucknow (Dutch, English, French, German, Italian, Polish, Portuguese, Spanish, Tagalog, Vietnamese), 勒克瑙 (Mandarin Chinese)

== M ==
English Name	Other names or former names
Macau	Aomen - 澳门 (Mandarin Chinese, Simplified), Maa Gau - 馬交 (Cantonese (traditional characters), informal), Macao (Italian, French, Romanian, Spanish), Macau (Danish, Dutch, English, German, Portuguese), Macàthu (Scottish Gaelic), Makao - マカオ / 澳門 (Japanese), Makao (Finnish, Polish, Serbian, Turkish), Makao - Макао (Bulgarian*, Macedonian*, Russian*, Serbian*), O Mun - 澳門 (Cantonese (traditional characters)), Omun - 오문 [澳門] (Korean), მაკაო (Georgian), 마카오 (Korean alternate), ما کاؤ (Urdu), மக்காவ் (Tamil)
(Indonesia) Makassar	Macasar (Spanish variant), Macassar (Portuguese, English variant), Macázar (Spanish variant), Makasar (Dutch, Polish, Norwegian var.), Makasar - Макасар (Macedonian), Makasaras (Lithuanian), Makassaru - マカッサル (Japanese), Mangkasara′ - ᨆᨀᨔᨑ - 𑻥𑻠𑻰𑻭 (Makassarese), Ujungpandang (former Indonesian), Ujung Pandang (former Malay), Wàngjiāxī - 望加锡 (Chinese (simplified characters)), ماکس سر (Urdu), மக்கசார் (Tamil)
(Malaysia) Malacca	Malaca (Portuguese, Spanish), Malacca (Italian), Malaka - Малака (Macedonian*), Malakka (Dutch, German, Polish, Turkish*), Mâ-la̍k-kah - 麻六甲 (Hokkien, Taiwanese), 马六甲 (Mandarin Chinese (simplified characters)), Malaqa - ملقا (Arabic), Marakka - マラッカ (Japanese), Melaka (Finnish, Malay, Indonesian), მალაკა (Georgian), مالک کا (Urdu), மலாக்கா (Tamil)
(India) Mangalore	ಕುಡ್ಲ-Kudla (Tulu), ಮಂಗಳೂರು-Mangaluru (Kannada), മംഗലാപുരം-Mangalapuram (Malayalam), ಕೊಡೆಯಾಲ-Kodeyaala (Havyaka), ಕೊಡಿಯಾಲ್-Kodial (Konkani), ಮೈಕಾಲ-Maikala (Beary),मंजरुन-Manjarun (Sankskrit)
(Philippines) Manila	Mainile (Irish), Manila (Basque, Bikol, Catalan, Cebuano, Croatian, Czech, Danish, English, Estonian, German, Ilokano, Indonesian, Italian, Latin, Latvian, Lithuanian, Malay, Norwegian, Portuguese, Polish, Romanian, Slovak, Slovene, Spanish, Swedish, Swahili, Turkish, Vietnamese, Waray), Manila - Манила (Bulgarian, Macedonian, Russian), Maníla (Icelandic), Mǎnílā - 马尼拉 (Mandarin Chinese (simplified characters)), Má-nî-la (Hokkien, Taiwanese), Manilha (Portuguese alternate), Manilla (Dutch, English alternate, German alternate, Finnish), Manille (French), Manilo (Esperanto), Manira - マニラ (Japanese), Maynila (Tagalog), Mênila - ম্যানিলা (Bengali), Menila (Kapampangan), مانيلا (Arabic), მანილა (Georgian), מנילה (Hebrew), 마닐라 (Korean), فیلیپین (Persian), மணிலா (Tamil), มะนิลา (Thai), مانىل (Uyghur), مانیلا (Urdu)
(Saudi Arabia) Mecca	Makkah al-Mukarramah - مكة المكرمة (Arabic, full name), Makka - मक्का (Hindi) Môkka - মক্কা (Bengali), Makka (Uzbek), Makkah (Malay), La Meca (Catalan, Spanish), Meca (Portuguese), La Mecca (Italian), Il-Mekka (Maltese), Mecca (English, Latin, Romanian), La Mecque (French), Meice (Irish), Meka (Croatian, Slovene), Meka - Мека (Macedonian*, Serbian), Mekka (Basque, Czech, Danish, Dutch, Finnish, German, Hungarian, Norwegian, Polish, Swedish), Mekka - メッカ (Japanese), Mekka - Мекка (Russian), Mekkah (Indonesian), Mekah (Malays), Məkkə (Azerbaijani), Mekke (Turkish), მექა (Georgian), ಮೆಕ್ಕಾ (Kannada), மெக்கா (Tamil), مکّہ (Urdu)
(Saudi Arabia) Medina	al Madina al Munawwarah - المدينة المنورة (Arabic, full name), Modina - মদিনা (Bengali), Madina - मदीना (Hindi), Madina (Uzbek), Мadinah (Indonesian, Malay), Medina (Dutch, Finnish, German, Hungarian, Italian, Latin, Romanian, Spanish, Portuguese), Al-Medina - אל-מדינה (Hebrew), Medina - メディナ (Japanese), Medina - Медина (Macedonian*, Russian, Serbian), Mədinə (Azerbaijani), Médine (French), Medine (Turkish) Medyna (Polish), Meidíne (Irish), მედინა (Georgian), மெதீனா (Tamil), مدینہ (Urdu). Former name: Yathrib - يثرب (Arabic), Yasrib - يثرب (Urdu, Persian), Iyasrib - ইয়াসরিব (Bengali), ಮದೀನಾ (Kannada)
(India) Mumbai	Bombai (Catalan), Bombaim (Portuguese), Bombaj (Polish), Bombaj - Бомбај (former Macedonian), Bombay (English [former and variant], French, Italian, Romanian, Spanish, Swedish, Turkish), Mumbai - মুম্বাই (Assamese, Bengali), Mumbai - ムンバイ (Japanese), Mumbaj - Мумбај (Macedonian*), Vomvái - Βομβάη (Greek), 孟買 (Chinese), मुंबई (Hindi, Marathi), ბომბეი / მუმბაი (Georgian), મુંબઈ (Gujarati), ಮುಂಬೈ (Kannada), 뭄바이 (Korean), मुम्बई (Nepali), ਮੁਮਬਏ (Panjabi), மும்பை (Tamil), بمبئی (Urdu)
(Bangladesh) Mymensingh	Moymonshingho - ময়মনসিংহ (Bengali), مؤمنشاہی Mominshahi (Urdu, Western Punjabi), مؤمنشاهی - Mominshāhī (Persian, Pashto), मय़मनसिंह (Hindi), मैमनसिंघ (Bhojpuri), 마이멘싱 (Korean), マイメンシン (Japanese), 迈门辛县 (Mandarin), ไมมันสิงห์ (Thai), Maimansingh (German), Maimansinghas (Lithuanian), Majmansing - Мајмансинг (Macedonian), Mojmonszinho (Polish), Маймансингх (Russian), Міменсінгх (Ukrainian) Historical names: Nasirabad নাসিরাবাদ (Bengali), নসরতশাহী - Nasratshahi/Nosrotshahi, মোমেনশাহী - Mu'min Shahi

== N ==
English Name	Other names or former names
(Palestine) Nablus	Flavia Neapolis (Latin), Nāblūs (Arabic), Nabloes (Dutch), Naburusu - ナブルス (Japanese), Naplouse (French), Nablús (Spanish), Nablus (English, Italian, German, Norwegian, Portuguese, Turkish), Nablus - Наблус (Macedonian, Russian), Neapolis - Νεάπολις (Byzantine Greek), Neapolis - ⲛⲉⲁⲡⲟⲗⲓⲥ (Coptic), Šăkēm - ࠔࠬࠥࠊࠝࠌ (Samaritan), Shkhem - שכם (Hebrew), ნაბლუსი (Georgian), نابلس (Urdu), நப்லூஸ் (Tamil)
(China) Nanchang	Nancianum (Latin*), Nánchāng - 南昌 (Mandarin)
(Japan) Nagasaki	Chángqí - 长崎/長崎 (simplified and traditional characters) (Mandarin), Nagasaki - 나가사키 (Korean), Nagasaki - Нагасаки (Macedonian*), Thành phố Nagasaki (Vietnamese)
(Japan) Naha	Naha - 那覇 / ナハ (Japanese kanji / kana), 나하 (Korean), English, Naha - Наха (Macedonian), Nàbà - 那霸 (Mandarin), Nakha - Наха (Russian)
(China) Nanjing	Nanchinum (Latin*), Nandžing - Нанџинг or Nanking - Нанкинг (Macedonian), Nánjīng - 南京 (Mandarin Chinese), Nankin - ナンキン (Japanese), Nankín (Spanish), Nanquim (Portuguese), Нанкин (Russian), Namgyeong 남경 (Korean), Nanjin - Нанжин (Mongolian), Nanzín'nk - Νανζίνγκ (Greek), Nanjing (English, French, Spanish, Portuguese, German, Italian), Nam Kinh (Vietnamese) formerly Nanking
(Azerbaijan) Nakhchivan	Naxçıvan (Azerbaijani), Nahçıvan (Turkish), Nahičevan - Нахичеван (Macedonian), Nakhijevan - Նախիջեվան (Armenian), Nexcivan - نخچيڤان (Kurdish), an Nacaiseaváin (Irish, Scottish Gaelic), Naktchevan (French), Nachitschewan (German), Nachitsjevan (Dutch), Nakhcivan (Italian), Nakhtxivan (Catalan), Najicheván (Spanish), Nakichevan (Portuguese), Nachitjevan (Swedish), Nakhitsjevan (Norwegian, Danish), Nahicseván (Hungarian), Nahhitševan (Estonian), Nakhichevanʼ - Нахичевань (Russian), Nakhichevanʼ - Нахічевань (Ukrainian), Nachiczewan (Polish), Nachičevan (Czech, Slovak), Nakhchivan - Нахчиван (Serbian), Nākhjāvān - نخجوان (Persian), Nakhchʼevani - ნახჭევანი (Georgian), Nakitseván - Νακιτσεβάν (Greek), Nakhchivan (Scots)*, Nakhitshevan - נחיצ'יבאן (Hebrew), Nakhitshifan - ناخيتشيفان (Arabic), Nākhtshewān - ܢܚܛܫܘܢ (Syriac), Nagsh-e Jahān - نقش جهان (former Persian), Naxouana - Ναξουὰνα (Ancient Greek) نخچی وان (Urdu), நக்கித்சேவான் (Tamil)
(China) Nanning	Nanning - 南寧 (Mandarin), Nanninga (Latin)
(Israel) Nazareth	An-Nāṣira - النَّاصِرَة (Arabic), Nac’rat - נָצְרַת (Hebrew), Nasair (Manx), Nāsarat - नासरत (Hindi) Nasaret (Swedish), Nāṣərath - נָצְרַת (Hebrew), Nasıra (Turkish), Naṣrath - ܢܨܪܬ (Syriac), Natzaret (Catalan), Nazara - Ναζαρά (Ancient Greek), Nazara (Alternative Latin), Nazaraiþ - 𐌽𐌰𐌶𐌰𐍂𐌰𐌹𐌸 (Gothic), Nazaré (Portuguese) Nazaret (Czech, Finnish, Galician, Italian, Spanish), Nazaret - Назарет (Kazakh, Macedonian, Russian), Názáret (Hungarian), Nazareth (Dutch, English, French, Latin), Názareth (Navajo)
(India) New Delhi	नई दिल्ली (Hindi), نئی دہلی (Urdu), ਨਵੀਂ ਦਿੱਲੀ (Punjabi), নয়া দিল্লী (Bengali), புது தில்லி (Tamil), 新德里 (Chinese), Nueva Delhi (Spanish) Neu-Delhi (German), Nieuw-Delhi (Dutch alternate), Nuova Delhi (Italian), Yeni Delhi (Azerbaijani, Turkish), Nju-Deli - Нью-Дели (Russian), Nju Delhi - Њу Делхи (Macedonian*, Serbian), Nova Delhi (Catalan, Portuguese), Újdelhi (Hungarian), Nowe Delhi (Polish), Νέο Δελχί (Greek), Dellium Novum (Latin) Deilí Nua (Irish), დელი (Georgian), Nova Délhi (Portuguese), नवी दिल्ली (Marathi), Nyūderī - ニューデリー (Japanese), Niw délii - ນິວເດລີ (Lao), ನವ ದೆಹಲಿ (Kannada), కొత్త ఢిల్లీ (Telugu), പുതിയ ഡെൽഹി (Malayalam)
(Cyprus) Nicosia	Ledra - Λήδρα or Ledrai - Λέδραι or Ledroi - Λήδροι or Ledron - Λεδρῶν (Ancient Greek), Lefkoşe or Lefkoşa (Turkish), Lefkosía - Λευκωσία (Greek), Leukousia - Λευκουσία (Byzantine Greek), Nicosia (Hungarian, Italian, Romanian, Spanish, Swedish), Nicósia (Portuguese), Nicosie (French), Nikosia / Lefkosia Nikoshia - ニコシア (Japanese), Nikosia (German), Nikosija (Latvian, Russian, Ukrainian), Nikosio (Esperanto), Nikozija (Lithuanian), Nikozija - Никозија (Macedonian*, Serbian), Nikozja (Polish), Nīqūsiyā (Arabic), ნიქოზია (Georgian), Nikosiya - निकोसिया or Lephkosiya - लेफकोसिया (Hindi), نکوسیا (Urdu), நிக்கோசியா (Tamil)

== O ==
English Name	Other names or former names
(Japan) Osaka	Dàbǎn - 大阪 (Chinese), Daepan - 大阪 [대판] (former Korean), Ohsaka (historic German), Ōsaka - 大阪 [おおさか] (Japanese), Osaka - 오사카 (Korean), Osákaa -ໂອ່ຊະກາ (Lao), Osaca (Portuguese), Osaka (English, Spanish, Italian), Osaka - Осака (Macedonian*),Ozaka - Οζάκα (Greek), Thành phố Ōsaka (Vietnamese), اوساکا (Urdu), ஒசாக்கா (Tamil), ოსაკა (Georgian),
(Japan) Okinawa	Chóngshěngshì - 冲绳市/沖縄市 (simplified and traditional characters) (Mandarin Chinese), Okinawa-shi - 沖縄市 [おきなわし] (Japanese), Okinawa-si - 沖縄市 [오키나와 시] (Korean), Cung Sing Si - 沖繩市 (Cantonese), Okinawa Stad (Afrikaans), Okinawa stad (Dutch), Madinah Okinawa - مدينة أوكيناوا (Arabic), Okinava - Окинава (Macedonian*), Okinawa gorod - Окинава город (Russian), Thành phố Okinawa (Vietnamese), Lungsod ng Okinawa (Tagalog)

== P ==
English Name	Other names or former names
(Indonesia) Padang	Badangh - بادنغ (Arabic), Bādōng - 巴东 (Mandarin Chinese), Padan - パダン (Japanese), Padang - 파당 (Korean), Padang - Паданг (Russian, Ukrainian, Belarusian, Bulgarian, Macedonian, Serbian), Padang (Indonesian, Malay, English, Dutch, French, Spanish, Portuguese), Padangas (Lithuanian), Paṭāṅ - படாங் (Tamil), Pādạng - ปาดัง (Thai), پادنگ (Persian), پادانگ (Urdu), पादांग (Marathi)
(Indonesia) Palembang	Balimbanj - باليمبانج (Arabic), Jùgǎng - 巨港 (Mandarin Chinese), Kī-káng / Kū-káng - 巨港 (Hokkien/Taiwanese), Palembang, Палембанг (Russian, Serbian, other languages using Cyrillic script), Palembangas (Lithuanian), Parenban - パレンバン (Japanese), Pelembang (Malay, Indonesian, colloquial speech), پالم بانگ (Urdu), பாலேம்பாங் (Tamil)
(Philippines) Pasig	Pasig (English, Bikol*, Cebuano*, Ilokano*, Kapampangan*, Spanish*, Tagalog*), Pashiggu - パシッグ (Japanese)
(Pakistan) Peshawar	Pex̌awar - پېښور (Pashto), Pishaur - پشور / ਪਿਸ਼ੌਰ (Punjabi, Hindko), Piśāvar - پشاور (Urdu),^{[KNAB]} Báishāwǎ - 白沙瓦 (traditional and simplified characters) (Mandarin Chinese)*, Báixiàwǎ - 白夏瓦 (traditional and simplified characters) (alternative Mandarin Chinese)*, Paśāvar - پشاور (Urdu [standard])*,^{[KNAB]} Pe̍h-sa-óa - 白沙瓦 (Hokkien/Taiwanese), Peśāvar - પેશાવર (Gujarati), Peśāvar - पेशावर (Hindi*,^{[KNAB]} Marathi*), Pešavar - Пешавар (Macedonian, Russian^{[KNAB]}), Peṣāvar - பெஷாவர் (Tamil)*, Peṣāvar - పెషావర్ (Telugu), Peśavāru - ޕެޝަވާރު (Dhivehi), Peşaver (Turkish)*, Pēšāwar - پیشاور (Dari) Pĕṣhāvar - പെഷാവര് (Malayalam),^{[KNAB]}, Péshawar - پېشاۋار (Uyghur)*, Peshāwaru - ペシャーワル (Japanese)*, Peshoār - পেশোয়ার (Bengali)*,^{[KNAB]} Pesyawareu - 페샤와르 (Korean) *, Pētwā - เปศวาร์ [pèːt waː] (Thai)*, Pişavar (Azerbaijani), Pišâvar - پیشاور (Persian)*, Pišāwar - بشاور (Arabic)*^{[KNAB]}
(North Korea) Pyongyang	Bình Nhưỡng (Vietnamese), Byawnyāngh - بيونيانغ (Arabic), Pêng-jióng - 平壤 (Hokkien/Taiwanese), Phenian (Romanian, Polish obsolete), Phenjan (Hungarian), Píngrǎng - 平壌 (Mandarin Chinese), Pjongjang (Polish), Pjongjang - Пјонгјанг (Macedonian*, Serbian), Pjöngjang (German), Pxenʼjan - Пхеньян (Russian), Pkheniani - ფხენიანი (Georgian), Pyeongyang/P'yŏngyang - 평양 [平壤] (Korean), Pyongyang (Danish, Dutch, English, French, Indonesian, Italian, Norwegian, Portuguese, Spanish, Swedish, Turkish), Pyonʼyan - 平壌 [ピョンヤン] (Japanese) Heijō - 平壌 [へいじょう] (Historical Japanese), پیونگ یانگ (Urdu), புயோங்கியாங் (Tamil), Pieng jaang - ພຽງຢາງ (Lao)
(Cambodia) Phnom Penh	Nam Vang - (Vietnamese), พนมเปญ - (Thai), Nom Pen (Spanish), نوم پن (Urdu), புனோம் பென் (Tamil), Jīnbiān - 金边 / 金邉 (traditional and simplified characters) (Mandarin Chinese), Punonpen - プノンペン (Japanese), Peunompen - 프놈펜 (Korean), Bnom Benh - بنوم بنه (Arabic), Pnom Pench - Πνομ Πενχ (Greek), Pnom Pen - پنوم پن (Persian/Farsi), Pnom Pen - Пном Пен (Macedonian*), Пномпень (Russian), Pahnom pénn -ພະນົມເປັນ (Lao)
(Vietnam) Phan Rang–Thap Cham	Phan Rang – Tháp Chàm (Vietnamese), Paṅrauṅ/Panrāṅ - Panduranga (Old Cham), Pandarang/Panrang - Panduranga (Modern Cham), Pāṇḍuraṅga - पाण्डुरङ्ग/पांडुरंग (Sanskrit/Marathi), Pandurang - पाण्डुरंग (Hindi), Bandoureanhka - ប៉ាន់ឌូរ៉ាន់ហ្គា (Khmer), Phaendurangka - ແພນດູຣັງກາ (Lao), Pạṇṯhurạngkha - ปัณฑุรังคะ (Thai), Panduurangarr - ပန္ဒူရံဂါး (Burmese), 潘郎-塔占 (Chinese), ファンラン=タップチャム (Japanese), Фанранг-Тхаптям (Russian)

== Q ==
English name	Other names or former names
(Uzbekistan) Qarshi	نخشب - Nakhshab (Persian), Карши - Karshi (Russian), Nasaf (former Uzbek), Karşı (Turkish), Karsji (Swedish), Qaršji (Finnish), Karši (Vepsian), Karszy (Polish)
(China) Qingdao	Chingdao - 칭다오 (Korean), Cheongdo - 청도 (Korean [alternate]), Chintao - 青島 [チンタオ] (Japanese), Cjindao (Latvian), Ḱingdao - Ќингдао (Macedonian), Tsingtao (English [former alternate]), Tsingtau (German), Thanh Đảo (Vietnamese)
(Iran) Qom	Qum (Azerbaijani, Kurdish, Uzbek), Ĥomo (Esperanto), قم - Qum (Arabic), Kum (Turkish, Turkmen)
(Pakistan) Quetta	Ko'eṭa کوئٹہ (Urdu), Ketta (Turkish*), کوټه - Kwaṭa (Pashto), شالکوټ - Shalkot (former Pashto), كويتا - Kawayitana (Arabic), Քվետա - K’veta (Armenian), Кветта - Kvetta (Russian)
(Philippines) Quezon City	Ciudad Quezón (Spanish), Kesonurbo (Esperanto), Kyusi (alternative Tagalog), Keson (Azerbaijani), Kesonstitija (Latvian), Кесон-Сити - Keson Siti (Russian), Кезон қаласы - Kezon Qalası (Kazakh), ケソンシティ - Kesonshiti (Japanese), क्विज़ोन शहर - Kvizon Shahar (Hindi)

== R ==
English Name	Other names or former names
(Vietnam) Rạch Giá	Racža (Lithuanian), راش جيا - Rash Jia (Arabic), 拉奇亚 - Lā Qíyà (Chinese)
(Palestine) Rafah	Rafá (Portuguese), Rafaḥ - رفح (Arabic), Rafah (English, French, Italian, Polish), Rafaḩ (Estonian), Rafiaḥ - רָפִיחַ (Hebrew), Rapiḫi - 𒊏𒉿𒄭 or Rapiḫu - 𒊏𒉿𒄷 (Assyrian) Rhaphia - Ῥαφία (Ancient Greek), Rpwḥw (Egyptian)
(India) Raipur	রায়পুর - Rāẏapura (Bengali), ರಾಯಪುರ - Rāyapura (Kannada), റായ്പൂർ - Rāypūr (Malayalam)
(India) Rajkot	રાજકોટ - Rājakōṭa (Gujarati), රාජ්කොට් - Rājkoṭ (Sinhala), राजकोट - Raajakot (Hindi), راجكوت - Rajkut (Arabic)
(Bangladesh) Rajshahi	রাজশাহী Rajshahi (Bengali), ৰাজশাহী Razshahī (Assamese), 𑒩𑒰𑒖𑒬𑒰𑒯𑒲 Rajshahi (Maithili), ꯔꯥꯖꯁꯥꯍꯤ Rājasāhi (Meitei), રાજશાહી - Rājashāhī (Gujarati), 𑐬𑐵𑐖𑐱𑐵𑐴𑐷 Rājashāhī (Nepal Bhasha), ରାଜଶାହୀ Rājashāhī (Odia), රාජශාහී Rājashāhī (Sinhala), राजशाही Rājashāhī (Hindi, Nepali, Marathi), راجشاهي Rājshāhī (Arabic), راجشاهی Rājshāhī (Persian, Sindhi, Pashto, Uyghur), راجشاہی Rājshāhī (Urdu, Punjabi)
(India) Ranchi	রাঁচী - Rām̐cī (Bengali), ᱨᱟᱺᱪᱤ - Rɔ̃ci (Santali) Ráncsí (Hungarian), Ráňčí (Czech)
(Bangladesh) Rangpur	রংপুর Rongpur (Bengali), ৰংপুৰ Rongpur (Assamese), رنغفور Ranghfūr (Arabic), رنگپور Rangpūr (Persian, Sindhi, Pashto, Urdu, Punjabi), رونگپۇر Rongpur (Uyghur)
(Syria) Raqqa	الرَّقة - Ar-Raqqah (Arabic),Νικηφόριον - Nikephorion (Ancient Greek), Καλλίνικος - Kallinikos (alternate Ancient Greek), Rakka (Turkish*), Ράκκα - Rakka (Greek), Racca (Waray), Reqa (Kurdish)
(Israel) Rehovot	רְחוֹבוֹת - Rḥobot (Hebrew), רחובות - Rkhubus (Yiddish), رحوفوت - Rahwfut (Arabic)
(Saudi Arabia) Riyadh	Ar-Riyāḍ - الرياض (Arabic), Rijad - Ријад (Macedonian*), Riyad (Turkish*), Riyāz - رياض (Persian, Urdu, Punjabi), Riyād - رىياد (Uyghur), Reyāz - ڕیاز (Central Kurdish), Riyadh - ৰিয়াধ (Assamese), Riyaz - রিয়াজ (Bengali), रियाद (Hindi), रियाध (Marathi), ਰਿਆਧ (Punjabi), ରିଆଦ (Odia), ரியாத் (Tamil), ರಿಯಾಧ್ (Kannada), റിയാദ് (Malayalam), Líyădé 利雅得 (Mandarin), Riyado - リヤド (Japanese), Riyadeu - 리야드 (Korean), Er-Riyad - Эр-Рияд (Russian), Riant - Ριάντ (Greek), Riad (Catalan, German, Spanish).
(Turkey) Rize	Rhizus or Rhizaeum (Latin) რიზინი - Rizini (Laz), Rizė (Lithuanian), ಹೆಚ್ಚಿಸಿ - Heccisi (Kannada), राइज़ - Raiz (Hindi), Риза - Riza (Russian), ሪዝ - Rīzi (Amharic), 瑞兹 - Ruì zī (Chinese), Ռիզե - Rrize (Armenian)
(Kazakhstan) Rudny	Рудный - Rýdnyı (Kazakh), Rudnyj (Upper Sorbian, Polish, Swedish), Roudny (French), Rudnij (Spanish), Рудный - Rudnyy (Russian)
(Georgia (country)) Rustavi	Rustawi (German, Upper Sorbian), Rusthavi (Estonian), Рустави - Rwstavï (Kazakh), Ռուսթավի - Rrust’avi (Armenian), ሩስታቭ - Rusitavi (Amharic), 루스 타비 - Luseutabi (Korean), ルスタヴィ- Rusutavu-i (Japanese)

== S ==
English Name	Other names or former names
(Pakistan) Sahiwal	Montgomery (Former colonial name changed to Sahiwal in 1966), ساہیوال (Urdu), சாஹிவால் (Tamil)
(Uzbekistan) Samarkand	Samarcand (old Romanian), Samarcanda (Catalan, Italian, Portuguese, Spanish), Samarcande (French), Samarkand - Самарканд (Dutch, German, Macedonian*, Norwegian, Romanian, Russian, Serbian, Slovene, Swedish), Samarkanda (Polish), Semerkant (Turkish), Samarkandas (Lithuanian), Samarkándhi - Σαμαρκάνδη (Greek), Səmərqənd (Azerbaijani), Samarqand (Uzbek, Estonian), Samarukando - サマルカンド (Japanese), Szamarkand (Hungarian), Somorkhond - সমরখন্দ (Bengali), სამარყანდი (Georgian), سمرقند (Persian/Urdu), సమర్ఖండ్ (Telugu), சமர்கந்து (Tamil)
(Japan) Sapporo	Sapóro - Σαπόρο (Greek), Saporo – Саппоро (Macedonian), Sapporo (English, French, Spanish, Portuguese, German, Irish), Sapporo – 札幌 [さっぽろ] (Japanese), Sapporo - 삿포로 (Korean), Sapporo – Саппоро (Russian), Satporo (Ainu), Satporo kotan (Ainu), Zháhuǎng – 札幌 (Mandarin Chinese), Sápolo -ສະໂປ່ໂລ (Lao)
(South Korea) Seoul	Gyeongseong - 경성 [京城] (historic Korean), Hànchéng - 漢城 (traditional characters) / 汉城 (simplified characters) (Mandarin Chinese [recently superseded by Shǒuʼěr 首爾]), Hanseong - 한성 [漢城] (historic Korean), Hàn-siâⁿ - 漢城 (Hokkien, Taiwanese), Hansung (historic English), Hán Thành (Vietnamese), Hanyang - 한양 [漢陽] (historic Korean variant), Jīngchéng - 京城 (historic Chinese), Keijo (historic English), Kanjō - 漢城 [かんじょう] (historic Japanese), Keijō - 京城 [けいじょう] (historic Japanese), Seoel (Dutch), Seoul - 서울 (Korean), Séoul (French), Seul (Croatian, Italian, Polish, Portuguese, Romanian, Turkish, Azerbaijani), Seul - Сеул (Bulgarian, Macedonian*, Mongolian, Russian, Serbian), Seulum (Latin), Seulo (Esperanto), Seula (Latvian), Seúl (Spanish), Seül (Catalan), Σεούλ (Greek), Seulas (Lithuanian), Shǒu’ěr - 首爾 (traditional characters) / 首尔 (simplified characters) (Mandarin Chinese), Soul (Czech, Slovak), Söul (Swedish, Estonian, historic German), Souru - ソウル (Japanese), Súl (Irish), Szöul (Hungarian), Xơ-un (Vietnamese), სეული (Georgian), กรุงโซล (Thai), ಸಿಯೋಲ್ (Kannada), సీయోల్ (Telugu), சியோல் (Tamil), سیؤل (Urdu)
(China) Shanghai	Shànghăi - 上海 (Mandarin Chinese), Shanhai - 上海 [シャンハイ] (Japanese), Sanghae - 상해 (Korean), Sanghaevum (Latin), Sciamhaevum (Ecclesiastical Latin) Shanghai (English, French, Spanish, Italian, German), Xangai (Portuguese, Catalan), Shankhay/Shankhaj - Шанхай (Russian), Sankái - Σαγκάη (Greek), Shankhain - Шанхайн (Mongolian), Ŝanhajo (Esperanto), Šangaj - (Croatian), Šangaj - Шангај (Macedonian*), Şangay (Turkish), Hangahai (Māori), ಶಾಂಘೈ (Kannada), Thượng Hải (Vietnamese)
(Azerbaijan) Shusha	Şuşa (Azerbaijani, Romanian, Turkish), Šuša - Шуша (Macedonian*, Serbian), Choucha (French), Schuscha (German), Shusha (Dutch), Scusca (Italian), Shushá (Spanish), Szusza (Polish), Shoshā - شوشا (Persian), Şuşî - شوشی (Kurdish), Shushi - Շուշի (Armenian), Shusha - შუშა (Georgian), Shusha - Шуша (Russian, Ukrainian, Belarusian, Bulgarian), Sousá - Σουσά (Greek), Shusha - שושאַ (Yiddish), Shusha - שושה (Hebrew), Shushā - ﺷﻮﺸﺎ (Arabic), Shushā - ܫܫܐ (Syriac), شوشا (Urdu), சுஷா (Tamil)
Singapore	Cingapura (Brazilian Portuguese), Shingapōru - シンガポール (Japanese), Shōnan - 昭南 (Japanese [colonial name]), Singapour (French), Singapoúri - Σινγκαπούρη (Greek), Singapur (Catalan, Croatian, Polish, Spanish, Turkish), Singapur - Сингапур (Macedonian*, Russian, Serbian), Singapūra (Latvian), Singapura (Malay, Indonesian, Portuguese), Singeapór (Irish), Singeapòr (Scottish Gaelic), Sin-ka-pho - 新加坡 (Minnan/Taiwanese), Singkapore - 싱카포레 (Korean), Szingapúr (Hungarian), Temasek (Malay, Indonesian [archaic]), Xīnjiāpō - 新加坡 (Mandarin Chinese), სინგაპური (Georgian), ಸಿಂಗಾಪುರ (Kannada), சிங்கப்பூர் (Tamil),सिंगापूर (Hindi), सिंहपुर (Hindi alternative), सिंहपुरः (Sanskrit), సింగపూర్ (Telugu), سنگاپور (Urdu), Singgápo -ສີງກະໂປ (Lao)
(India) Srinagar	Sirī nagar - سری نگر (Urdu, Punjabi), Sirīnagar سِریٖنَگَر (Kashmiri), Śrīnagar श्रीनगर (Hindi), Srīnagar ਸ੍ਰੀਨਗਰ (Punjabi - Gurmukhi)
(Indonesia) Surabaya	Sìshuǐ - 泗水 (Mandarin Chinese), Soerabaja (Dutch), Surabaia (Portuguese), Surabaja (Latvian, Lithuanian, Polish), Surabaja - Сурабаја (Macedonian), Surabajo (Esperanto), Surabaya - سورابايا (Arabic), スラバヤ (Japanese), Сурабая (Russian), Suroboyo (spoken Javanese), سورا بایا (Urdu), சுராபயா (Tamil)
(Bangladesh) Sylhet	Silet - সিলেট (Bengali, Bishnupriya Manipuri), سيلهت (Arabic, Persian), silhat - سلہٹ (Urdu, Western Punjabi, Pashto, Sindhi), सिलेट (Hindi), सिलहट (Marathi), ਸਿਲੇਟ (Eastern Punjabi), સિલ્હેટ (Gujarati), സില്ഹെത് (Malayalam), சில்ஹெட் (Tamil), සිල්හෙට් (Sinhala), ಸಿಲೇಟ್ (Kannada), Srihotto (Polish), Silhet - Силхет (Macedonian), Silkhet - Силхет (Russian, Kazakh), Сілет (Ukrainian), Szilhet (Hungarian), Silhatas (Lithuanian), Silheto (Esperanto), 실렛 (Korean), シレット (Japanese), 錫爾赫特市 (Mandarin)

== T ==
English Name	Other names or former names
(Taiwan) Taipei	Daebuk – 대북 (Korean*), Đài Bắc (Vietnamese*),^{[KNAB]} Dài-báe̤k – 台北 (Mindong*), Daizbaek (Zhuang*), De poq [T3] – 台北 (Shanghainese Wu), Htuingpe – ထိုင်ပေ (Burmese*), Taibei (Estonian, Latvian), Táiběi – 台北 (simplified characters) / 臺北 (traditional characters) (Note: Although use of the full traditional form of 臺 is encouraged by the ROC Ministry of Education, the simplified form 台北 is now more common than 臺北 in Taiwan and areas where traditional Chinese is normally used.) (Mandarin Chinese*),^{[KNAB]} Ţaibei – ტაიბეი (Georgian*), Táiběi fǔ – 臺北府 (historical Mandarin Chinese), Taibi – តៃប៉ិ (Khmer), Taihoku – 台北(たいぺい) (Japanese*),^{[KNAB]} Tâi-pak – 台北 (Hokkien [Taiwanese]*, Teochew), Tâi-pak-hú – 臺北府 (historical Hokkien [Taiwanese]), Taipahu (Tsou), Taipak (Bunun), Taipakʉ (Saaroa), Taipe (Kanakanabu), Taipe – ತೈಪೆ (Kannada*), Taipé (Portuguese*), Taipē – తైపే (Telugu), Ṭa‘ipē – ޓައިޕޭ (Divehi), Taīpē – ਤਾਈਪੇ – ٹاۓپی (Punjabi**), Tāipe – তাইপে (Bengali*), Tāipē – ताइपे (Hindi*), Tāipē – ٹاۓپی (Urdu*), Tāipē – ତାଇପେ (Oriya*), Taipeh (German*,^{[KNAB]} archaic English, Fijian*, Luxembourgish*), Taipei (Afrikaans*, Albanian*, Basque*, Breton*, Catalan*, Cebuano, Croatian*, Danish*, Dutch*, Estonian*, Finnish*, French*, West Frisian*, Galician*, Ilocano*, Indonesian*, Irish*, Italian*, Javanese*, Malagasy*, Malay*, Norwegian*, Occitan*, alternative Portuguese, Romanian*, Swahili*, Swedish*, Tagalog*, Tok Pisin*, Turkish*, Venetian*, Welsh*, Yoruba*), Taipéi (Achinese*, Asturian, Spanish*), Taípei (Icelandic*), Taïpéi – Ταϊπέι (Greek*), Tāipei – ताइपेइ (Marathi*), Tā'ipē'i – ताइपेइ (Nepali*, Newari*), Taipeia (Latin*), Taipeium (Latin), Taipeja (Latvian*), Taipėjus (Lithuanian*), Tajbej – Тайбей (Ukrainian*), Tajbej – Тайбэй (Belarusian*, Buryat*, Mongolian*), Tajbèj – Тайбэй (Russian*),^{[KNAB]} Tajpe – Тайпе (Bulgarian*), Tajpej (Hungarian*,^{[KNAB]} Polish*,^{[KNAB]} Slovenian*), Tajpej – Тайпей (alternative Bulgarian, Tajik*), Tajpej – Тайпэй (Yakut*), Tajpej – Тајпеј (Macedonian*, Serbian*), Tāybayh – تَايْبِيه (Arabic*), Taybey – تایپه (Azerbaijani**, Uzbek*), Taybey – Тайбэй (Kazan Tatar*), Taybey – Տայբեյ (alternative Eastern Armenian), Taybéy – Тайбэй (Kazakh*, Kyrgyz*), Taýbeý (Turkmen), Tʿaybey – Թայբեյ (Eastern Armenian*), Tayipē – ታይፔ (Amharic*), Tāyipē – තායිපේ (Sinhalese*), Tayipèh (Franco-Provençal*), Taypae’ (Saisiyat), Taypak (Amis, Nataoran), Taypè (Haitian Creole*), Tâype – تایپه (Persian*), Taypey – טאיפיי (Hebrew*), Taypey – Տայբեյ (alternative Western Armenian), Tāypey – தாய்பெய் (Tamil*), Tāypēy – തായ്പേയ് (Malayalam*), Tʿaypey – Թայբեյ (Western Armenian), Tchaj-pej (Czech*, Slovak*), Teybëy – تەيبېي (Uyghur*), Tha’e pe – ཐའེ་པེ (Tibetan*), Thaipē – ไทเป [tʰaj peː (Thai*), Thòi-pet – 台北 (Siyen Hakka*), Thòi-pet-fú – 臺北府 (historical Hakka), Tòihbāk – 台北 (Cantonese), تایپێ (Central Kurdish), Tai pay -ໄຕເປ (Lao)
(China) Taiyuan	Taiyuenum (Latin*)
(Turkey) Tarsus	Juliopolis (Latin), Tārša - 𒋫𒅈𒊭 (Hittite), Tarson - Տարսոն (Armenian), Tarsos - Ταρσός (Greek), Tarsus (Latin), Ṭarsūs - طَرسُوس (Arabic)
(Uzbekistan) Tashkent	Tachkent (French), Taixkent (Catalan), Taschkent (German), Tashkent - Ташкент (Russian, Ukrainian), Tashqand (Arabic), Tasjkent (Dutch, Swedish, Danish), Taskéndi - Τασκένδη (Greek), Daşkənd (Azerbaijani), Taskent (Hungarian, Italian, Spanish), Taszkent / Taszkient (Polish), ताशकन्द (Hindi), Taškenta (Latvian), Taškent (Slovak, Croatian, Finnish), Taškent - Ташкент (Macedonian*, Serbian), Taaskenti (Romanian, Turkish), Taškentas (Lithuanian), Toshkent (Estonian, Uzbek), Tashikento - タシケント (Japanese), Taiscint (Irish), ტაშკენტი (Georgian), 타슈켄트 (Korean), تاشکنت (Persian), Tāšqand تاشقند (Urdu), தாஷ்கந்து (Tamil), Taşkent (Turkish), Tashkhond - তাশখন্দ (Bengali)
(Georgia (country)) Tbilisi	Dìbǐlìsī - 第比利斯 (simplified characters) (Chinese),^{[KNAB]} Gürƶex - Гуьржех (Chechen),^{[KNAB]} Guržeğe - ГуржегӀе (Ingush),^{[KNAB]} Kalak - Калак (Ossetian),^{[KNAB]} Kart - Қарҭ (Abkhaz), Karti - ქართი (Mingrelian*), Kwrdžy - Курджы (Kabardian [Circassian]),^{[KNAB]} Tbili - თბილი (Svan), Tbilisi - თბილისი (Georgian,^{[KNAB]} alternative Mingrelian), Tbilisi (Basque, Irish, Italian, Latvian, Maltese, Polish, Romanian, Serbian, Slovene, Swedish), Tbîlîsî (Kurdish), Tbilisi - Тбилиси (Macedonian*, Russian^{[KNAB]}), Tbilisi - Тбілісі (Ukrainian), Tbilissi (Catalan, French), Tbilisis (Lithuanian), Tbiliszi (Hungarian), Teflīs - تفلیس (Persian),^{[KNAB]} Teubillisi / T'ŭbillisi - 트빌리시 (Korean), Tíbǐlǐxī - 提比里西 (Chinese [Taiwan]), Tiflīs (Arabic), Tiflis (Dutch, German, Spanish, Turkish, Azerbaijani, former English, former Italian, former Romanian), Tiflída - Τιφλίδα (Greek),^{[KNAB]} Tiflis - Тифлис (former Russian),^{[KNAB]} Tífúlìsī - 提弗利司 / Tífúlǐsī - 梯弗裡斯 (Chinese [archaic]), Tobirishi - トビリシ (Japanese)*, Ţp'ilisi - ტფილისი (historic Georgian), Tp'xis - Տփխիս (Armenian), Tyflis (former Polish), طفلس (Urdu), திமிலிசி (Tamil)
(Iran) Tehran	Tahran (Turkish), Teheran (Catalan, Croatian, Danish, Finnish, German, Italian, Polish, Romanian), Teheran - Техеран (Macedonian*), Téhéran (French), Teerão (Portuguese), Tehron (Uzbek), Teheran - テヘラン (Japanese), Teherán (Hungarian, Spanish), تهران (Persian), Teheráni - Τεχεράνη (Greek), Tihrān تہران (Urdu), தெஹ்ரான் (Tamil)
(China) Tianjin	Choenjin - 천진 (Korean), Tiānjīn - 天津 (Mandarin Chinese), Tianjin (English, French, Spanish, Italian), Tjenǵin - Тјенѓин (Macedonian), Tenshin - 天津 (Japanese), Tiencinum (Latin*), Thiên Tân (Vietnamese), Tientsin (Turkish*), Tyanjin - Тяньжин (Mongolian),
(Russia) Tobolsk	Tabalq – Табалˮ (Nenets),^{[KNAB]} Tabolsk – Табольск (Belarusian*), Têpył woš – Тәпыӆ вош (Khanty),^{[KNAB]} Tobıl – Тобыл (Kazakh),^{[KNAB]} Tobolium (Latin*), Tobolscum (Latin), Tobolsk (French*, German*, Polish*, Spanish*), Tobolsk - Тоболск (Macedonian), Tobol’sk – Тобольск (Russian),^{[KNAB]} Tobol's’k – Тобольськ (Ukrainian*), Toboļska (Latvian*),^{[KNAB]} Toborisuku – トボリスク (Japanese*), Tubıl – Тубыл (Bashkir*, Kazan Tatar*^{[KNAB]}), Tuōbóěrsīkè – 托博爾斯克 (Mandarin Chinese*), Tūpel ūs – Тӯпел ӯс (Mansi)^{[KNAB]}
(Japan) Tokyo	Dokyo - 도쿄 (Korean), Dōngjīng - 東京 (traditional characters) / 东京 (simplified characters) (Mandarin Chinese), Donggyeong - 동경 [Hanja: 東京] (Korean), Dùnggìng - 東京 (Cantonese), Edo / Yedo (English [archaic]), Edo - 江戸 [えど] (historic Japanese), Jiānghù - 江戶 (historic Chinese), Tocio (Latin), Tóiceo (Irish), Tokia - То́кіа (Belarusian) Tokio (Croatian, Dutch, historic English, Finnish, German, Italian variant, Polish, Romanian, Serbian, Spanish, Uzbek), Tokio - Токио (Bulgarian* Macedonian*, Russian*), Tókio - То́кіо (Ukrainian), Tókio - Tόκυο (Greek), Tokió (Hungarian), Tokjo (Maltese, Silesian, ), Tokyo (Danish, Indonesian, Italian, Malay, Turkish), Tōkyō - 東京 [とうきょう] (Japanese), Tang-kiaⁿ - 東京 (Minnan / Taiwanese), Tokyo / Đông Kinh (Vietnamese), Tòquio (Catalan), Tóquio (Portuguese), โตเกียว (Thai), ტოკიო (Georgian), Tokijas (Lithuanian), टोक्यो (Hindi), ٹوکیو (Urdu), ತೋಕಿಯೋ (Kannada), டோக்கியோ (Tamil)
(Turkey) Trabzon	Torabuzon - トラブゾン (Japanese), Trabzon (Azerbaijani, Romanian, Turkish), Trabzon - Трабзон (Macedonian*), Trapesunta (former Italian), Trapizoni - ტრაპიზონი (Georgian*), Trapezunt (German, Polish, former Romanian), Trapezúnda - Τραπεζούντα (Greek), Trapezus (Latin), Trebisonda (Catalan, Italian*, Portuguese, Spanish), Trebizonda (former Romanian alternative to Trapezunt), Trébizonde (French), Trebizon (former variant in English), Տրապիզոն (Armenian), ترابزون (Urdu), திராப்சன் (Tamil), طربزون (Ottoman Turkish, Persian)
(Lebanon) Tyre	Ṣurru (Akkadian), Ṣūr - 𐤑𐤓 (Phoenician), Ṣūr - صُور (Arabic), Tyre (English), Tyros - Τύρος (Ancient Greek), Tyrus (Latin), Tzor – צוֹר (Hebrew)

== U ==
English Name	Other names or former names
(Mongolia) Ulaanbaatar	Bogdo-Kurenʼ - Богдо-Курень (historical Russian),^{[KNAB]} Daa Khüree - Даа Хүрээ (historical Mongolian),^{[KNAB]} Ikh Khüree - ᠶᠡᠬᠡ ᠬᠦᠷᠢᠶᠡᠨ Их Хүрээ (historical Mongolian),^{[KNAB]} Kùlún 库伦 (simplified characters) / 庫倫 (traditional characters) (historical Mandarin Chinese),^{[KNAB]} Kuren (historical English), Niislel Khüree - ᠨᠡᠶᠢᠰᠯᠡᠯ ᠬᠦᠷᠢᠶᠡᠨ Нийслэл Хүрээ (historical Mongolian),^{[KNAB]} Nomyn Khüree - ᠨᠣᠮ ᠤᠨ ᠬᠦᠷᠢᠶᠡᠨ Номын Хүрээ (historical Mongolian), Örgöö - ᠥᠷᠭᠦᠭᠡ Өргөө (historical Mongolian),^{[KNAB]} Oulan-Bator (French),^{[KNAB]} Ourga (historical French), Ulaan Baatar - Улаан Баатар (Buryat), Ulaanbaatar - Улаанбаатар (Mongolian)*, Ulaɣanbaɣatur - ᠤᠯᠠᠭᠠᠨᠪᠠᠭᠠᠲᠤᠷ (Classical Mongolian),^{[KNAB]} Ulan Baatr - Улан Баатр (Kalmyk)*, Ulan-Baatır - Улан-Баатыр (Kyrgyz), Ulanbátar (Slovak)*, Ulánbátar (Irish)*, Ulan-Batır - Ұлан-Батыр (Kazakh)*, `Ūlānbātǭ - อูลานบาตอร์ [ʔuː laːn baː tɔː] (Thai), Ulánbátor (Hungarian)*, Ulan Bator (Indonesian*, Italian*, Malay*), Ulan Bator - Улан Батор (Macedonian*), Ulán Bator (Spanish, Portuguese), Ułan Bator (Polish)*, Ulan-Bator - Улан–Батор (Russian*,^{[KNAB]} Ukrainian*, Uzbek), Ulan-Batori - ულან-ბატორი (Georgian)*, Ulan Batur (Turkish)*, Ulanbatur ئۇلانباتۇر (Uyghur)*,^{[KNAB]} Ullanbatareu - 울란바타르 (Korean)*, Uranbātoru - ウランバートル (Japanese)*,^{[KNAB]} Urga (historical English, Latin*), Ürgöö - Үргөө (historical Buryat), Uruga - ウルガ (historical Japanese),^{[KNAB]} Wūlánbātuō - 乌兰巴托 (simplified characters) / 烏蘭巴托 (traditional characters) (Mandarin Chinese)^{[KNAB]}, उलान बतोर (Hindi), اولان باتر (Urdu), உலான்பத்தார் (Tamil)
(China) Ürümqi	Wūlǔmùqí - 乌鲁木齐 / 烏魯木齊 (simplified and traditional characters) (Mandarin Chinese), Dihua - 迪化 (historical Mandarin Chinese), Urumuchi - ウルムチ(Japanese), 우루무치 (Korean), Ürimşi - Үрімші (Kazakh), Ouroúmki - Ουρούμκι (Greek) Ürümchi - ئۈرۈمچی (Uyghur), उरुमची (Hindi), Urumçi (Turkish), Urumči - Урумчи (Macedonian), Urumczi (Polish)

== V ==
English Name	Other names or former names
(Laos) Vientiane	Biantian - 비안티안 (Korean alternative), Bientian - 비엔티안 (Korean), Bienchan - ビエンチャン (Japanese), Éng-tin - 永珍 (Hokkien, Taiwanese), Vʼentʼjan - Вьентьян (Russian), Vīangchan - ວຽງຈັນ (Lao), Vienchan - ヴィエンチャン (Japanese), Vienciana (Portuguese), Viêng Chăn (Vietnamese), Vientijan - Виентијан (Macedonian*), Vientián (Spanish), Vientian (Slovak), Vientianas (Lithuanian), Vientiane (Catalan, Danish, Dutch, English, French, German, Icelandic, Indonesian, Italian, Norwegian, Portuguese, Swahili, Swedish), Vienţiani - ვიენტიანი (Georgian), Wànxiàng - 萬象 (traditional characters) / 万象 (simplified characters) (Mandarin Chinese usage in China), Wīangčhan - เวียงจันทน์ (Thai), Wientian (Polish), Wihngjān - 永珍 (Cantonese), Yǒngzhēn - 永珍 - (Mandarin Chinese usage outside of China and historical form in China), Yún-tsṳ̂n - 永珍 (Hakka), Vieng Chan (Khmer), ویئن تیان (Urdu), வியாந்தியன் (Tamil)
(India) Visakhapatnam	Vishakapatonamu -ヴィシャカパトナム (Japanese), vizakhap’atnami-ბვიზახაპათნამი (Georgian), Viśākhāpaṭṭanam-વિશાખાપટ્ટનમ્ (Gujarati), vishaakhaapattanam-विशाखापत्तनम (Hindi), ויסאכאטפטנם (Hebrew), ವಿಶಾಖಪಟ್ಟಣಂ (Kannada), bisakapateunam - 비사카파트남 (Korean), viśākhapaṭṭaṇaṁ - വിശാഖപട്ടണം (Malayalam), विशाखापट्टणम (Marathi), ବିଶାଖାପାଟନମ୍ (Odia), Viśākhāpaṭanama -ਵਿਸ਼ਾਖਾਪਟਨਮ (Punjabi), viśākāpaṭṭam-විශාකාපට්ටම් (Sinhalese), Vicākappaṭṭiṉam-விசாகப்பட்டினம் (Tamil), Viśākhapaṭnaṁ-విశాఖపట్నం(Telugu), Wiṣ̄āk̄hā pạt tnạm-วิศาขาปัตตนัม(Thai), وشاکھاپٹنم (Urdu), Wéi shā kǎ pà tè nán - 維沙卡帕特南 (Traditional Chinese), Vishakkhapatnam - Вишакхапатнам (Russian), Bishakhapottonom-বিশাখাপত্তনম (Bengali), Visakkhapatnam-Вісакхапатнам (Ukrainian)
(Russia) Vladivostok	Beulladiboseutok - 블라디보스톡 (alternative spelling in Korean), Beulladiboseutokeu - 블라디보스토크 (Korean), Beullajiboseu-ttokeu - 블라지보스또크 (spelling used by Koreans in China), Fúlādíwòsītuōkè - 符拉迪沃斯托克 (Chinese),^{[KNAB]} Hǎishēnwǎi - 海參崴 (Chinese* traditional usage and usage outside of China),^{[KNAB]} Haesamwi - 해삼위 (obsolete name in Korean), Uladzivastok – Уладзівасток (Belarusian*), Urajio - 浦塩 (alternative name in Japanese),^{[KNAB]} Urajiosutoku - ウラジオストク (Japanese), Ullajibosŭttokhŭ - 울라지보스또크 (spelling used in North Korean standard), Vladivostok (French*, Vietnamese*), Vladivostok – Владивосток (Macedonian*, Russian*), Vladyvostok – Владивосток (Ukrainian*),^{[KNAB]} Wladiwostok (German*), Władywostok (Polish*),^{[KNAB]} ولادی ووستوک (Urdu), விலாடிவோஸ்டாக் (Tamil)

== X ==
English Name	Other names or former names
(China) Xiamen	Amoi - アモイ (Japanese), `Āmǭi - อามอย (historic Thai), Amoj - Амой (historic Russian), Amoy (historic English), Â-muòng 廈門 (Mindong), Ē-mn̂g - 廈門 (Hokkien, Taiwanese), Ē-mûi - 廈門 (Zhangzhou Hokkien), Hạ Môn (Vietnamese), Hahmùhn - 廈門 (Cantonese), Hamun - 하문 (Korean), Hà-mûn - 廈門 (Hakka), Hà-mún - 廈門 (Gan), Shiamen - シアメン (Japanese alternative), Siamœ̄n - เซียะเหมิน (Thai), Sjamenʼ - Сјамен (Macedonian), Sjamynʼ - Сямынь (Russian),^{[KNAB]} Xiàmén - 廈門 (traditional characters) / 厦门 (simplified characters) (Mandarin Chinese), சியாமென் (Tamil), سیامن (Urdu)
(China) Xi'an	Chang'an - 长安 (simplified characters) / 長安 (traditional characters) (Mandarin [archaic]), Seian - 西安 (Japanese), Sian - 시안 (Korean), Sian - Сиан (Macedonian), Сиань (Russian), Siganum (Latin), Tây An (Vietnamese)

== Y ==
English Name	Other names or former names
(Russia) Yakutsk	Djokuuskaj Дьокуускай (Yakut local variant),^{[KNAB]} Jakuck (Polish), Jakutsk (German), Jakutsk - Јакутск (Macedonian*), Jakutsk - Якутск (Russian),^{[KNAB]} Jákutskaj - Якутскай (Yakut standard variant),^{[KNAB]} Jakutʼsk - Якутськ (Ukrainian), Yǎkùcíkè - 雅庫茨克 (traditional characters) / 雅库茨克 (simplified characters) (Mandarin Chinese), Yakūtsuku - ヤクーツク (Japanese), یاقوتسک (Urdu), யாகுட்ஸ்க் (Tamil)
(Japan) Yamaguchi	ያማጉቺ - Yamaguchī (Amharic), Јамагучи - Jamaguči (Macedonian), Ямагучи - Yamagwçï (Kazakh), 山口 - Shānkǒu (Chinese)
(Myanmar) Yangon	Rangoon (former English), ນະຄອນຢາງກຸ້ງ - Yang Kung (Lao), ย่างกุ้ง - Ỳāngkûng (Thai), 仰光 - Yǎng guāng (Chinese), Rangún (Spanish), Rangunum (Latin), Jangona (Latvian), Jangunās (Lithuanian), Rangum (Portuguese), Ýangon (Turkmen), Jangún (Icelandic), Yangjgvangh (Zhuang), Ρανγκούν - Ran'nkoún (Greek), ரங்கூன் - Raṅkūṉ (Tamil), ያንግየን - Yanigiyeni (Amharic), ᱭᱮᱝᱜᱳᱱ - Yeṃgon (Santali), यांगून - Yaangoon (Hindi), යැන්ගොන් - Yængon (Sinhala)
(Iran) Yazd	යස්ඩ් - Yasḍ (Sinhala), Jazd (Croatian), Iazde (Portuguese), يزد - Yazid (Arabic), याज्ड - Yājḍa (Marathi), Yezd (Turkish*)
(Russia) Yekaterinburg	Ekaterimburgo (Spanish), Ēkaṭērin bērg - ఏకటేరిన్ బేర్గ్ (Telugu), Ekaterinburg (Catalan [alternate], Romanian, Turkish, Italian), Ekaterinburg - Екатеринбург (Macedonian*), Ek'at'erinburga - ეკატერინბურგი (Georgian), Ekaterinburuku/Ekacherinburuku - エカテリンブルク/エカチェリンブルク (Japanese), Ekaterinoupolis - Αικατερινούπολις (Greek - καθαρεύουσα), Iaketarinburg (Catalan), Iekaterinbourg / Ekaterinbourg (French), Jekaterinenburg (Dutch), Jekaterinburg (Danish, German, Serbian (Latin), Slovene, Swedish), Jekaterinburga (Latvian), Jekaterinburgas (Lithuanian), Jekaterynburg (Polish), Jekatyerinburg (Hungarian), Sverdlovsk (former name), یکاترین بورگ (Urdu), ஏக்காதேரின்பர்க் (Tamil)
(Armenia) Yerevan	Eireaván (Irish), Ereban - エレバン (Japanese), Erevan (Catalan, French, English [rare], Portuguese variant, Romanian, Slovene), Ereván (Spanish), Erevan - Ереван (Macedonian*), Erevāna (Latvian), Erevani - ერევანი (Georgian), Erevanum (Latin), Erewan - Երևան (Armenian), Erivan (Turkish), Erywań (Polish), Iereván - Υερεβάν (Greek), Iravān (Persian), İrəvan (Azerbaijani), Jerevan (Czech, Danish, Estonian, Finnish, Slovak, Serbian (Latin), Swedish), Jerevan - Jереван (Serbian), Jereván (Hungarian), Jerevanas (Lithuanian), Jerewan / Eriwan (Dutch, German), Revan (former Turkish), Yerevan (Indonesian, Portuguese, Uzbek), Yerevan - Երեւան (Armenian), Yerevan - Ереван (Russian, Ukrainian), Yērevān - యేరెవాన్ (Telugu), Yirīfān (Arabic), اری وان (Urdu), யெரேவான் (Tamil)
(China) Yinchuan	Gîn-chhoan (Southern Min), Ngân Xuyên (Vietnamese), Yinzconh (Zhuang), Ngiùn-chhôn (Hakka), ينتشوان - Yantashwan (Arabic), 銀川 - Ginkawa (Japanese), 인촨 - Inchwan (Korean)
(Indonesia) Yogyakarta	Dzhokyakarta - Джокьякарта (Russian), Džogjakarta (Lithuanian), Jogja, Jokja (colloquial Javanese, Indonesian), Jogjakarta - Јогјакарта (Macedonian), Jokujakaruta - ジョグジャカルタ市 (Japanese), Ngayogyakarta Hadiningrat (official Javanese name), Rìrě - 日惹 (Mandarin Chinese), Jogjakarta, Yujyakarta - يوجياكرتا (Arabic), جوگ جاکارتا (Urdu), யோக்யகர்த்தா (Tamil)
(Japan) Yokohama	Jokohama (Afrikaans, Polish, Slovenina, Slovak, Finnish), ᏲᎪᎭᎹ - Yogohama (Cherokee), ᐃᐅᑯᐊᒪ - Iukuama (Inuktitut), ইয়োকোহামা - Iẏōkōhāmā (Bengali), 横滨 - Hèngbīn (Chinese), ໂຍໂຄຮາມາ - Onyokhama (Lao), يوكوهاما - Yukuhama (Arabic), योकोहामा - Yokohaama (Hindi), ಯೋಕೊಹಾಮಾ - Yōkohāmā (Kannada)
(Russia) Yuzhno-Sakhalinsk	Влади́мировка - Vladimirovka (Former Russian), ユジノサハリンスク- Yujinosaharinsuku (Japanese),Yujno Saxalinsk (Uzbek), Yujno-Sahalinsk (Turkish*), 豊原市 - Toyohara (former Japanese), Joezno-Sachalinsk (Afrikaans), Juschno-Sachalinsk (German), Jużnosachalińsk (Polish)

== Z ==
English Name	Other names or former names
(Iran) Zabol	ዛቦል - Zaboli (Amharic), জাবল - Zabol (Bengali), ზაბოლი - Zaboli (Georgian), Zabols (Latvian), Zabolis (Lithuanian), Zabul (Turkish*), زابول - Zabul (Arabic)
(Iran) Zahedan	زاهدان - Zâhedân (Balochi), Zahedanas (Lithuanian), Zahidan (Turkish*), زاهدان - Zahidan (Arabic), ហ្សាដាន់ - Hsaadan (Khmer)
(Philippines) Zamboanga	ዛምቦጋን - Zamibogani (Amharic), জ়মবআংগা - Zamaba'āṅgā (Bengali), Sambuangan (Tausūg), Замбоанги - Zamboangi (Russian), ઝામબોંગા - Jhāmabōṅgā (Gujarati)
(Jordan) Zarqa	ហ្សាកា - Hsaaka (Khmer), Az-Zarka (Polish), Zerka (Turkish), Zarká (Czech)
(Azerbaijan) Zaqatala	Ç̌araqhi - Чӏарахъи (Lak),^{[KNAB]} Zakatala (Turkish), Zakatala - ზაქათალა (Georgian),^{[KNAB]} Zakatala - Закатала (Avar^{[KNAB]}, Macedonian*), Zak‘at‘ala - Զաքաթալա (Armenian), Zakataly - Закаталы (Russian),^{[KNAB]} Zaqatala [Загатала] (Azerbaijani)^{[KNAB]} زکا تالا (Urdu), சகாதலா (Tamil)
(Azerbaijan) Zangilan	Kovsakan - Կովսական (Armenian),^{[KNAB]} Kovsakan - Ковсакан (Russian alternative), Pirčevan - Пирчеван (historical Russian pre–1957),^{[KNAB]} Pirçivan (historical Azerbaijanipre–1957),^{[KNAB]} Zangelan - Զանգելան (historical Armenian pre–1993),^{[KNAB]} Zangelan - Зангелан (Russian),^{[KNAB]} Zəngilan [Зәнҝилан] (Azerbaijani),^{[KNAB]} Zengelan [Зәнгәлан, زهنگهلان] (Kurdish),^{[KNAB]} Zengilan (Turkish), Zengilan - Зенгилан (Macedonian*), زانگیلان (Urdu), சங்கிலான் (Tamil)
(China) Zhengzhou	Teishū - 鄭州 (Japanese), Jeongjeou - 정저우 (Korean), Tshinghtshu - تشنغتشو (Arabic), Dzhŭndzhou - Джънджоу (Bulgarian), ჟენჟოუ - Zhenzhou (Georgian), Чжэнчжоу - Chzhenchzhou (Russian), Жэнчжоу - Jenchjou (Mongolian), Džendžou (Latvian), Чжэнчжоу - Çjénçjow (Kazakh), Hengенгжу - Hengengžu (Macedonian), ઝેંગઝુ - Jhēṅgajhu (Gujarati), झेंग्झौ Jhengjhau (Hindi), Trịnh Châu (Vietnamese), เจิ้งโจว - Ceîng cow (Thai), ஜெங்ஜோ - Jeṅjō (Tamil)
(China) Zhoushan	Chiu-san-chhī (Southern Min), Ciŭ-săng (Eastern Min), ហ្សូសាន់ - Hsaausan (Khmer)
(China) Zibo	ஜிபோ - Jipō (Tamil), സിബോ - Sibēā (Malayalam), Зибо - Zïbo (Kazakh), ઝિબો - Jhibō (Gujarati), Цзыбо - Tszybo (Russian)
(Turkey) Zonguldak	ઝોંગુલદાક - Jhōṅguladāka (Gujarati), ზონგულდაკი - Zonguldak’i (Georgian), ব্যাটম্যান - Byāṭamyāna (Bengali), Zonguldakā (Latvian), Zonguldakas (Lithuanian)

== See also ==
- Endonym and exonym
- Articles on names of places in Asia
- List of Latin place names in Asia
- List of Asian regions with alternative names
- List of names of European cities in different languages
- List of country names in various languages
- List of Arabic place names
- List of Hebrew place names
- List of Turkish exonyms
- Japanese exonyms
- Vietnamese exonyms
