= List of Asian regions with alternative names =

Many regions and provinces of Asia have alternative names in different languages. Some regions have also undergone name changes for political or other reasons. This article attempts to give all known alternative names for all major Asian regions, provinces, and territories. It also includes some lesser regions that are important because of their location or history.

This article does not offer any opinion about what the "original", "official", "real", or "correct" name of any region is or was. Regions are listed alphabetically by their current best-known name in English, which does not necessarily match the title of the corresponding article. The English version is followed by variants in other languages, in alphabetical order by name, and then by any historical variants and former names.

Foreign names that are the same as their English equivalents may be listed, to provide an answer to the question "What is that name in..."?

== A ==
English name	Other names or former names
Anatolia	Anadolu (Turkish), Αnatolē - Aνατολή or Anatolía - Ανατολία (Greek), Anatòlia (Catalan), Anatolia (Finnish, Italian, Romanian, Spanish), Anatolie (Czech, French), Anatolien (Danish, German, Swedish), Anatolië (Dutch), Anatólia (Hungarian, Portuguese), Anatoolia (Estonian), Anatolija (Latvian, Slovene), Asia Minor (Latin, variant in English), Asia Minore (Italian alternate), Azia e Vogël (Albanian), Mala Aziya - Мала Азия (Bulgarian), Väike-Aasia (Estonian alternate)

== B ==
English name	Other names or former names
Bengal	Bengal (Breton, Cebuano, Estonian, Finnish, Icelandic, Polish, Romanian, Turkish, Welsh), Bengala (Basque, Catalan, Italian, Portuguese, Spanish), Bengale (French), Bengalen (Danish, Dutch, German, Swedish), Bengali (Albanian), Bengalija (Lithuanian), Bengalio (Esperanto), Bengaliya - Бенгалия (Russian), Bengaliya - Бенгалія (Ukrainian), Bengálsko (Czech), Benggala (Indonesian), Bôngo - বঙ্গ or Bangla - বঙ্গদেশ (Bengali), Vengáli - Βεγγάλη (Greek)
Borneo	Borneo (Catalan, Estonian alternate, German, Italian, Polish, Spanish), Bornéo (French), Bornéu (Portuguese), Kalimantan (Estonian, Indonesian)

== C ==
English name	Other names or former names
Cochinchina	Cochinchina or Kotschinchina (German), Cochinchina (Portuguese, Spanish), Cochinchine (French), Cocincina (Italian), Cotxinxina (Catalan), Kochinchina (Polish), Koşinşin (Turkish*), Kotšinhiina (Estonian)

== D ==
English name	Other names or former names
Deccan	Dècan (Catalan), Decán (Spanish), Decão (Portuguese), Deccan (Italian), Deccan or Dekkan (French), Dekan (Polish, Turkish*), Dekkan (Estonian), Dekkan or Dekhan (German)

== J ==
English name	Other names or former names
Java	Cava (Turkish*), Giava (Italian), Jaava (Estonian), Java (French, German, Portuguese, Spanish), Jawa (Indonesian, Javanese)

== K ==
English name	Other names or former names
Kashmir	Cachemira (Spanish), Cachemire (French), Caixmir (Catalan), Caxemira (Portuguese), Cashmere (English variant [obsolete]), Kaschmir (German), Kashmir (Italian), Kaśmīr - कश्मीर (Dogri, Hindi), Kaszmir (Polish), Keşmir (Turkish*), Kôśīr - कॅशीर - کٔشِیر / Kôśur - कॉशुर / Kośūr - कोशूर (Kashmiri), کشمیر (Balti), کشمیر (Gojri), ཀཤམིར (Ladakhi), کشمیر (Poonchi/Chibhali), کشمیر (Shina), كھسىمڭر (Uyghur)
Kazakhstan	Qazaqstan (Kazakh), Kazajistan (Spanish), Kazakhstan (Russian, English, etc), Qazaxıstan (Azerbaijani), Kazakistan (Turkish)

== M ==
English name	Other names or former names
Malacca	Malaca (Catalan, Portuguese, Spanish), Malacca (Italian), Malacka (Swedish), Malaka (French), Malakka (Dutch, Finnish, German, Polish, Turkish), Malakka - Малакка (Russian), Melaka - Мелака (Bulgarian), Melaka (Danish, French alternate, Indonesian, Malay, Spanish alternate)

== S ==
English name	Other names or former names
Siberia	Siber (Estonian), Sibèria (Catalan), Siberia (Albanian, Italian, Latin, Romanian, Spanish), Sibéria (Portuguese), Sibir' - Сибирь (Russian), Sibirien (German), Sibirya (Turkish*), Syberia (Polish)

== T ==
English name	Other names or former names
Tibet	Bod - བོད་ (Tibetan), Thivét - Θιβέτ (Greek), Tibet (Afrikaans, Basque, Breton, Catalan, Czech, Danish, Dutch, French, German, Indonesian, Italian, Swedish, Turkish, Welsh), Tibet - Тибет (Bulgarian, Russian), Tíbet (Icelandic, Spanish), Tibeta (Latvian), Tibetas (Lithuanian), Tibete (Portuguese), Tibeti (Albanian), Tibeto (Esperanto), Tiibet (Estonian, Finnish), Tüvd - Түвд (Mongolian), Tybet (Polish), Xī Zàng - 西藏 (Chinese)
Tonkin	Tonchino (Italian), Tongking (Estonian), Tonkin (French, German, Polish, Portuguese), Tonkín (Spanish)

== See also ==
- List of European regions with alternative names
- Endonym and exonym
- List of alternative country names
- Latin names of regions
- List of places
